This is a list of comics based on films. Often a film becomes successful, popular or attains cult status and the franchise produces spin-offs that may include comics. The comics can be direct adaptations of the film, a continuation of the story using the characters, or both.

Comics allow a degree of flexibility which can result in crossovers with other film characters as well as those from comics. In particular, the Aliens and Predator comics have crossed over with The Terminator, Superman, Batman, Judge Dredd and Green Lantern.

There are a number of companies that specialise in licensed properties, including Dark Horse, Titan, Avatar and Dynamite Entertainment. With the bigger series the license can often pass between a number of companies over the history of the title.

Comics based on films

#
 $1,000,000 Duck, Walt Disney Showcase #5 (Gold Key Comics, October 1971)
 101 Dalmatians:
 101 Dalmatians (1961), Four Color (Volume 2) #1183 (Dell Comics, March 1961)
 101 Dalmatians (1996), Disney Comic Hits #16 (Marvel Comics, March 1961)
 20 Million Miles More #1—4, based on 20 Million Miles to Earth (TidalWave Productions, 2007)
 2000 Maniacs #1—3 (Aircel Comics, September—November 1991)
 20,000 Leagues Under the Sea, Four Color (Volume 2) #614 (Dell Comics, February 1955)
 28 Days Later:
 28 Days Later: The Aftermath (Fox Atomic Comics, April 2007)
 28 Days Later #1—24 (Boom! Studios, July 2009—June 2011)
 3 Ninjas Kick Back #1—3 (NOW Comics, June—August 1994)
 The 3 Worlds of Gulliver, Four Color (Volume 2) #1158 (Dell Comics, January 1961)
 The 4 Horsemen of the Apocalypse, Four Color (Volume 2) #1250 (Dell Comics, 1961)
 55 Days at Peking (Gold Key Comics, September 1963)
 6 Black Horses, Dell Movie Classics #750 (Dell Comics, January 1963)
 The 7th Voyage of Sinbad, Four Color (Volume 2) #944 (Dell Comics, September 1958)

A
 The Abominable Dr. Phibes:
 "The Abominable Dr. Phibes/The Deadly Comedy", Vincent Price Presents #13 (TidalWave Productions, November 2009)
 "Untitled Dr. Phibes storyline", Vincent Price Presents #14 (TidalWave Productions, December 2009)
 "The Return of Dr. Phibes", Vincent Price Presents #28 (TidalWave Productions, March 2011)
 Absolute Zero, based on Interstellar, Wired (Condé Nast Publications, November 2014)
 The Absent-Minded Professor:
 The Absent-Minded Professor, Four Color (Volume 2) #1199 (Dell Comics, April 1961)
 Son of Flubber (Gold Key Comics, April 1963)
 The Abyss #1—2 (Dark Horse Comics, June—July 1989)
 The Adventures of Baron Munchausen #1—4 (NOW Comics, July—October 1989)
 The Adventures of Ford Fairlane #1—4 (DC Comics, May—August 1990)
 The Adventures of Huckleberry Finn, Four Color (Volume 2) #1114 (Dell Comics, July 1960)
 The Adventures of Robin Hood #1—7 (Gold Key Comics, March 1974—January 1975)
 The Adventures of Sharkboy and Lavagirl in 3-D:
 "Dream Team!", Disney Adventures (Disney Publishing Worldwide, May 2005)
 After Earth: Innocence (Dynamite Entertainment, October 2012)
 Aladdin:
 Aladdin: The Official Movie Adaptation (Disney Comics, 1992)
 The Return of Aladdin #1—2 (Disney Comics, 1993)
 Aladdin #1—11 (Marvel Comics, August 1994—June 1995)
 Aladdin and the King of Thieves, Disney Comic Hits #13 (Marvel Comics, October 1996)
 Alexander the Great, Four Color (Volume 2) #688 (Dell Comics, May 1956)
 Alfred Hitchcock's Psycho #1—3, based on Psycho (Innovation Publishing, February—September 1992)
 Alice in Wonderland (1951):
 Alice in Wonderland, Four Color (Volume 2) #331 (Dell Comics, May 1951)
 Unbirthday Party with Alice in Wonderland, Four Color (Volume 2) #341 (Dell Comics, July 1951)
 Alice in Wonderland: The Story of the Movie in Comics (Dark Horse Comics, March 2020) ISBN:  / 
 Alice in Wonderland (2010) (Boom! Studios, July 2010) ISBN:  / 
 Alien:
 Alien: The Illustrated Story (Heavy Metal, 1979)
 Aliens (Dark Horse Comics, May 1988—present)
 Alien³ #1—3 (Dark Horse Comics, June—July 1992)
 Superman/Aliens #1—2 (DC Comics/Dark Horse Comics, July—September 1995)
 Batman/Aliens #1—2 (DC Comics/Dark Horse Comics, March—April 1997)
 Alien Resurrection #1–2 (Dark Horse Comics, October—November 1997)
 WildC.A.T.s/Aliens #1 (Image Comics/Dark Horse Comics, August 1998)
 Green Lantern Versus Aliens #1–4 (DC Comics/Dark Horse Comics, September—December 2000)
 Superman/Aliens II: God War #1—4 (DC Comics/Dark Horse Comics, May—November 2002)
 Batman/Aliens II #1—3 (DC Comics/Dark Horse Comics, January—March 2003)
 Judge Dredd versus Aliens: Incubus #1–4 (Dark Horse Comics, March—June 2003)
 Aliens/Vampirella #1–6 (Dark Horse Comics/Dynamite Entertainment, 2015—2016)
Alien Nation:
 Alien Nation (DC Comics, December 1988)
 Alien Nation: The Spartans #1–4 (Adventure Publications, 1990)
 Alien Nation: A Breed Apart #1–4 (Adventure Publications, November 1990—March 1991)
 Ape Nation (Adventure Publications, February–June 1991)
 Alien Nation: The Skin Trade #1–4 (Adventure Publications, March–June 1991)
 Alien Nation: The Firstcomers #1–4 (Adventure Publications, May–August 1991)
 Alien Nation: The Public Enemy #1–4 (Adventure Publications, December 1991—March 1992) 
Alien vs. Predator:
 Aliens vs. Predator (comic storyline), Dark Horse Presents #34—36, (Dark Horse Comics, August—October 1989)
 Aliens vs. Predator (comic series) (Dark Horse Comics/Marvel Comics, June 1990—present)
 Aliens versus Predator versus The Terminator #1–4 (Dark Horse Comics, April—July 2000)
 Witchblade/Aliens/Darkness/Predator: Mindhunter #1–3 (Dark Horse Comics, November 2000—February 2001)
 Witchblade/Aliens/Darkness/Predator: Overkill #1–2 (December 2000—March 2001) 
 Superman and Batman versus Aliens and Predator #1—2 (DC Comics/Dark Horse Comics, January—February 2007)
 Predator vs. Judge Dredd vs. Aliens: Splice and Dice #1–4 (Dark Horse Comics/IDW Publishing, July 2016—June 2017) 
 An American Tail: Fievel Goes West #1—3 (Marvel Comics, January—February 1992)
 The Animal World, Four Color (Volume 2) #713 (Dell Comics, August 1956)
 Annie, Marvel Comics Super Special #23 (Marvel Comics, Summer 1982)
 Archie vs. Sharknado, based on the Sharknado film series (Archie Comics, July 2015)
 The Aristocats:
 The Aristocats (Gold Key Comics, March 1971)
 O'Malley and the Alley Cats #1—9 (Gold Key Comics, April 1971—January 1974)
 The Aristokittens #1—9 (Gold Key Comics, October 1971—October 1975)
 Arizona Legion, Movie Comics #2 (Fawcett Comics, May 1939)
 Around the World in 80 Days, Four Color (Volume 2) #784 (Dell Comics, February 1957)
 Around the World Under the Sea, Dell Movie Classics #030 (Dell Comics, December 1966)
 The A-Team:
 The A-Team: War Stories: B.A. (IDW Publishing, March 2010)
 The A-Team: War Stories: Hannibal (IDW Publishing, March 2010)
 The A-Team: War Stories: Face (IDW Publishing, April 2010)
 The A-Team: War Stories: Murdock (IDW Publishing, April 2010)
 The A-Team: Shotgun Wedding #1—4 (IDW Publishing, March—April 2010)
 Atlantis, the Lost Continent, Four Color  #1188 (Dell Comics, May 1961)
 Atlantis: The Lost Empire (Dark Horse Comics, June 2001)
 Attack of the Killer Tomatoes:
 Attack of the Killer Tomatoes: The Comic #1 (Killer Tomato Entertainment, Inc., 2003)
 Attack of the Killer Tomatoes #1 (Viper Comics, October 2008)
 Avatar (Dark Horse Comics, May 2017—present)

B
 Babes in Toyland, Four Color (Volume 2) #1282 (Dell Comics, 1962)
 Back to the Future:
 Back to the Future (2015) #1—25 (IDW Publishing, 2015—2017)
 Back to the Future: Citizen Brown #1—5 (IDW Publishing, 2016)
 Back to the Future: Biff to the Future #1—6 (IDW Publishing, 2017)
 Back to the Future: Tales from the Time Train #1—6 (IDW Publishing, 2017—2018)
 Transformers/Back to the Future #1—4 (IDW Publishing, 2020—2021)
 Bad Girls Go to Hell #1—3 (Aircel Comics, December 1992—February 1993)
Bambi:
 Bambi, Four Color (Volume 2) #12 (Dell Comics, 1942)
 Bambi's Children, Four Color (Volume 2) #30 (Dell Comics, 1943)
 Thumper Follows His Nose, Four Color (Volume 2) #243 (Dell Comics, September 1949)
 Bayonetta: Bloody Fate, Bessatsu Shōnen Magazine (Kodansha, November—December 2013)
 Battle Amongst the Stars #1—3, based on Battle Beyond the Stars (TidalWave Productions, March—May 2010)
 Battle of the Bulge, Dell Movie Classics #056 (Dell Comics, June 1966)
 Beach Blanket Bingo, Dell Movie Classics #058 (Dell Comics, September 1965)
 Beatles - Yellow Submarine (Gold Key Comics, 1968)
 Beauty and the Beast:
 Beauty and the Beast (1991) (W. D. Publications, Inc., 1991)
 The New Adventures of Beauty and the Beast #1—2 (Disney Comics, July—August 1992)
 Beauty and the Beast #1—13 (1994) (Marvel Comics, September 1994—September 1995)
 Bedknobs and Broomsticks, Walt Disney Showcase #6 (Gold Key Comics, January 1972)
 Beethoven #1—3 (Harvey Comics, March—July 1994)
 Ben-Hur, Four Color #1052 (Dell Comics, November 1959)
 Beowulf #1—4 (IDW Publishing, October 2007)
 Big (Hit Comics, March 1989)
 The Big Circus, Four Color (Volume 2) #1036 (Dell Comics, August 1959)
 The Big Country, Four Color (Volume 2) #946 (Dell Comics, 1958)
 The Big Land, Four Color (Volume 2) #812 (Dell Comics, 1957)
 Big Red (Gold Key Comics, November 1962)
Big Town, Movie Comics #1 (Fiction House, December 1946)
 Big Town Czar, Movie Comics #4 (DC Comics, July 1939)
 Big Trouble in Little China:
 Big Trouble in Little China #1—25 (Boom! Studios, 2014—2016)
 Big Trouble in Little China/Escape from New York #1—6 (Boom! Studios, 2016—2017)
 Big Trouble in Little China: Old Man Jack #1—12 (Boom! Studios, 2017—2018)
 The Big Wheel, Movie Love #1 (Eastern Color Printing, February 1950)
 Bill & Ted:
 Bill & Ted's Excellent Adventure #1 (DC Comics, 1989)
 Bill & Ted's Excellent Comic Book #1—12 (Marvel Comics, 1991–1992)
 Bill & Ted's Bogus Journey #1 (Marvel Comics, September 1991)
 Bill & Ted's Most Triumphant Return #1—6 (Boom! Studios, March—August 2015)
 Bill & Ted Go to Hell #1—4 (Boom! Studios, February—May 2016)
 Bill & Ted Save the Universe #1—5 (Boom! Studios, June—October 2017)
 Bill & Ted Are Doomed #1—4 (Dark Horse Comics, September—December 2020)
 Bill & Ted Roll the Dice #1—4 (Opus, June—October 2022)
 Bill & Ted Present Death (Opus, November 2022)
 Bill & Ted's Day of the Dead (Opus, November 2022)
 Bill & Ted's Excellent Holiday Special (Opus, December 2022)
 Bimbos in Time (Draculina Publishing, 1994)
 The Black Cauldron (Scholastic, July 1985) 
 Black Dynamite, One-shot (Ape Entertainment, April 2011); Regular series #1—3 (IDW Publishing, December 2013—August 2014)
 The Black Hole, Walt Disney Showcase #54 (Gold Key Comics, January 1980); Regular series #1—4 (Gold Key Comics, March—September 1980)
 Black Jack, Movie Love #4 (Eastern Color Printing, August 1950)
Black Scorpion:
 Black Scorpion #1—4 (TidalWave Productions, November 2009—February 2010)
 The Legend of Isis/Black Scorpion #1 (TidalWave Productions, June 2010)
 Blackbeard's Ghost (Gold Key Comics, June 1968)
 Blade Runner:
 Blade Runner, Marvel Comics Super Special #22 (Marvel Comics, September 1982)
 Blade Runner 2019 #1—12 (Titan Comics, August 2019—December 2020)
 Blade Runner 2029 #1—12 (Titan Comics, January 2021—March 2022)
 Blade Runner Origins #1—12 (Titan Comics, April 2021—July 2022)
 Blade Runner 2039 #1—3 (Titan Comics, January 2023—present)
 The Blazing Forest, Movie Love #15 (Eastern Color Printing, June 1952)
 Blue Montana Skies, Movie Comics #4 (DC Comics, July 1939)
 The Boatniks, Walt Disney Showcase #1 (Gold Key Comics, October 1970)
 Bon Voyage!, Dell Movie Classics #068 (Dell Comics, December 1962)
 The Boy and the Pirates, Four Color (Volume 2) #1117 (Dell Comics, June 1960)
 The Boy from Indiana, Movie Love #3 (Eastern Color Printing, 1950)
 Bram Stoker's Burial of the Rats #1—3 (Roger Corman's Cosmic Comics, April—June 1995)
 Bram Stoker's Dracula: Official Comics Adaptation of the Francis Ford Coppola Film #1—4 (Topps Comics, 1992)
 The Brave One, Four Color (Volume 2) #773 (Dell Comics, February 1957)
 Brave Warrior, Motion Picture Comics #112 (Fawcett Comics, September 1952)
 The Brigand, Fawcett Movie Comic #18 (Fawcett Comics, August 1952)
 Bubba Ho-Tep:
 Bubba Ho-Tep and the Cosmic Blood-Suckers #1—5 (IDW Publishing, March—July 2018)
 Army of Darkness/Bubba Ho-Tep #1—4 (Dynamite Entertainment, February—June 2019)
 Buckaroo Banzai:
 The Adventures of Buckaroo Banzai Across the 8th Dimension, Marvel Comics Super Special #33 (Marvel Comics, November 1984)
 Buckaroo Banzai: Return of the Screw (Moonstone Books, May—November 2006)
 "A Christmas Corrall", Moonstone Holiday Super Spectacular (Moonstone Books, December 2007)
 Buckaroo Banzai: The Prequel (Moonstone Books, August—December 2008)
 Buckaroo Banzai: Big Size (Moonstone Books, January 2009)
 Buckaroo Banzai: Origins (Moonstone Books, April 2009)
 Buckaroo Banzai: Hardest of the Hard (Moonstone Books, October 2009—February 2010)
 Buckaroo Banzai: Tears of a Clone (Moonstone Books, March—October 2022)
Buffy the Vampire Slayer: The Origin #1—3 (based on Joss Whedon's original screenplay of the eponymous 1992 film, Dark Horse Comics, January—March 1999)
 Bullwhip Griffin (Gold Key Comics, June 1967)

C
 The Cabinet of Dr. Caligari:
 Caligari 2050 #1—3 (Monster Comics, January—March 1992)
 The Cabinet of Dr. Caligari #1—3 (Monster Comics, April—September 1992)
 Caligari 2050: Another Sleepless Night... (Monster Comics, 1993)
 The Cabinet of Doctor Caligari #1—2 (Amigo Comics, January—March 2017)
Caged Heat 3000 #1—3, based on the Caged Heat film series (Roger Corman's Cosmic Comics, November 1995—January 1996)
 Captain Fury, Movie Comics #4 (DC Comics, July 1939)
 Captain Kronos – Vampire Hunter:
 Captain Kronos – Vampire Hunter (1978), Hammer's Halls of Horror #20 (Top Sellers Ltd., March 1978)
 Captain Kronos – Vampire Hunter (2017) #1—4 (Titan Comics, October 2017—January 2018)
Captain Sindbad (Gold Key Comics, September 1963)
Carbine Williams, Fawcett Movie Comic #19 (Fawcett Comics, October 1952)
 Cars:
 The World of Cars: The Rookie (Boom! Studios, March—September 2009)
 The World of Cars: Radiator Springs (Boom! Studiis, July—October 2009)
 Cars (Boom! Studios, Cars November 2009—June 2010) 
 Cars: Adventures of Tow Mater (Boom! Studios, July—December 2010) 
 Cars 2: The Story of the Movie in Comics! (Marvel Comics, July—August 2011)
 Cars 3: Movie Graphic Novel (Joe Books Inc., June 2017) ISBN:  / 
 Casper (Marvel Comics, July 1995)
 The Castilian, Dell Movie Classics #110 (Dell Comics, November 1963-January 1964)
 The Cat, Dell Movie Classics #109 (Dell Comics, December 1966)
 The Cat from Outer Space, Walt Disney Showcase #46 (Gold Key Comics, October 1978)
 Chakra: The Invincible (Graphic India, 2013—2017)
 Cheyenne Autumn, Dell Movie Classics #112 (Dell Comics, April-June 1965)
 Child's Play:
 Child's Play 2 (Innovation Publishing, 1991)
 Child's Play (1991) (Innovation Publishing, May—December 1991)
 Child's Play 3 (Innovation Publishing, January—March, 1992)
 Hack/Slash vs. Chucky (Devil's Due Publishing, March 2007)
 Chucky (Devil's Due Publishing, April—November 2007, February 2009)
 Chitty Chitty Bang Bang (Gold Key Comics, February 1969)
 A Chump at Oxford, Movie Comics #6 (DC Comics, October 1939)
 Cinderella:
 Cinderella, Four Color (Volume 2) #272 (Dell Comics, 1950)
 "Gus and Jaq Save the Ship", Wheaties cereal premium (1951)
 "Fairest of the Fair", giveaway promo for American Dairy Association (1955)
 Cinderella: The Story of the Movie in Comics (Dark Horse Comics, February 2020) ISBN: 
 Circus World, Dell Movie Classics #115 (Dell Comics, September 1964)
 Clash of the Titans:
 Clash of the Titans (Western Publishing, January 1981) ISBN:  / 
 Wrath of the Titans #1—4 (TidalWave Productions, May 2007—May 2008)
 Wrath of the Titans: Cyclops (TidalWave Productions, January 2009)
 Wrath of the Titans: Revenge of Medusa #1—3 (TidalWave Productions, April—July 2011)
 Clive Barker:
Clive Barker's Hellraiser (Marvel Comics/Epic Comics, 1989–1992)
Clive Barker's Nightbreed (Marvel Comics/Epic Comics, 1990)
Hellraiser vs Nightbreed: Jihad (Marvel Comics/Epic Comics, 1991)
Hellraiser III: Hell on Earth (Marvel Comics/Epic Comics, 1992)
Close Encounters of the Third Kind, Marvel Comics Super Special #3 (Marvel Comics, June 1978)
 Cloverfield/Kishin, based on Cloverfield (Kadokawa Shoten, January—May 2008)
 The Comancheros, Four Color (Volume 2) #1300 (Dell Comics, 1962)
 Conan the Barbarian:
 Conan the Barbarian, Marvel Comics Super Special #21 (Marvel Comics, August 1982)
 Conan the Destroyer, Marvel Comics Super Special #35 (Marvel Comics, December 1984)
 Condorman #1—3 (Gold Key Comics, November 1981—January 1982)
Coneheads #1—4 (Marvel Comics, June—September 1994)
 Cool World, Prequel limited series #1—4 (DC Comics, April—September 1992); The Official Comic Adaptation Special (DC Comics, 1992)
 The Conqueror, Four Color (Volume 2) #690 (Dell Comics, April 1956)
 Copper Canyon (Fawcett Comics, 1950)
 Countdown, Dell Movie Classics #150 (Dell Comics, October 1967)
 The Creature, Dell Movie Classics #142 (Dell Comics, December-February 1963)
 Creepshow (Plume, July 1982) ISBN:  / 
 Cripple Creek, Motion Picture Comics #114 (Fawcett Comics, January 1953)
 Crosswinds, Movie Love #11, (Eastern Color Printing, October 1951)
 The Crow: City of Angels #1—3 (Kitchen Sink Press, July—September 1996)
 The Curse of Frankenstein, The House of Hammer #2—3 (Top Sellers Ltd., November—December 1976)
 The Curse of the Werewolf, The House of Hammer #10 (Top Sellers Ltd., July 1977)

D
 Dakota Lil (Fawcett Comics, 1949)
 Darby O'Gill and the Little People, Four Color (Volume 2) #1024 (Dell Comics, 1959)
 The Dark (Norstar Comics, 1993)
 The Dark Crystal:
 The Dark Crystal, Marvel Comics Super Special #24 (Marvel Comics, March 1983)
 Legends of the Dark Crystal Vols. 1—2 (Tokyopop, November 2007—August 2010)
 The Dark Crystal: Creation Myths #1—3 (Boom! Studios/Archaia Entertainment, February 2015—October 2016)
 The Power of the Dark Crystal #1—12 (Boom! Studios/Archaia Entertainment, February 2017—March 2018)
 Beneath the Dark Crystal #1—12 (Boom! Studios/Archaia Entertainment, July 2018—August 2019)
 Darkman:
 Darkman, The Official Comics Adaptation (Marvel Comics, September 1990); Sequel limited series #1—6 (Marvel Comics, April—September 1993)
 Darkman vs. Army of Darkness #1—4 (Dynamite Entertainment, August 2006—March 2007)
 David and Goliath, Four Color (Volume 2) #1205 (Dell Comics, July 1961)
 David Arquette's The Tripper (Image Comics, May 2007)
 Davy Crockett, Indian Scout, Cowboy Western Comics #26 (Charlton Comics, January 1950); Movie Love #2 (Eastern Color Printing, April 1950)
 Dear Brat, Movie Love #10 (Eastern Color Printing, August 1951)
 Death Race 2020 #1—8, based on Death Race 2000 (Roger Corman's Cosmic Comics, April—November 1995)
 Death Walks the Streets (The Scream Factory, June 2008—present)
 The Deathsport Games #1—3 (based on Deathsport, TidalWave Productions, November 2010—January 2011)
 Debbie Does Dallas:
 Debbie Does Dallas #1—18 (Aircel Comics, March 1991—February 1993)
 Debbie Does Dallas 3-D #1 (Aircel Comics, January 1992)
 Debbie Does Comics #1—3 (Aircel Comics, February—April 1992)
 Dee Snider's Strangeland: Seven Sins (based on Strangeland, Fangoria Comics/The Scream Factory, August 2007—April 2008)
 The Deep (Marvel Comics, November 1977)
 Demolition Man #1—4 (DC Comics, November 1993—February 1994)
 Demonic Toys: Play at Your Own Risk! #1—4 (Eternity Comics, January—August 1992)
 Destination Moon (Fawcett Comics, 1950)
 The Devil's Rejects (IDW Publishing, August 2005):
 Top Secret Clown Business
 Psycho Babble
 Die Hard:
 Die Hard: Year One #1—8 (Boom! Studios, August 2009—March 2010)
 A Million Ways to Die Hard (Insight Comics, October 2018)
 Die, Monster, Die!, Dell Movie Classics #175 (Dell Comics, March 1966)
 Dinosaurus!, Four Color (Volume 2) #1120 (Dell Comics, August 1960)
 The Dirty Dozen, Dell Movie Classics #180 (Dell Comics, October 1967)
 Django Unchained:
 Django Unchained #1—7 (DC Comics/Vertigo, February—October 2013)
 Django/Zorro #1—7 (DC Comics/Vertigo/Dynamite Entertainment, November 2014—May 2015) 
 A Dog of Flanders, Four Color #1088 (Dell Comics, April 1960)
 Dollars Trilogy:
 The Man with No Name #1—11 (Dynamite Entertainment, May 2008—June 2009)
 The Good, the Bad and the Ugly #1—8 (Dynamite Entertainment, July 2009—February 2010)
 Dollman #1—4 (Eternity Comics, September 1991—1992)
 Donald Duck:
 Donald in Mathmagic Land, Four Color (Volume 2) #1051 (Dell Comics, 1959)
 Donald and the Wheel, Four Color (Volume 2) #1190 (Dell Comics, 1961)
 Dondi, Four Color #1176 (Dell Comics, January 1961)
 Don't Give Up the Ship, Four Color (Volume 2) #1049 (Dell Comics, 1959)
 Dorothy of Oz Prequel #1—4, based on Legends of Oz: Dorothy's Return (IDW Publishing, March—September 2012)
 Dr. Giggles #1—2 (Dark Horse Comics, October 1992)
 Dr. Who and the Daleks, Dell Movie Classics #190 (Dell Comics, December 1966)
 Dracula, Dell Movie Classics #231 (Dell Comics, October-December 1962)
 Dracula (Hammer film series):
 Dracula, The House of Hammer #1 (Top Sellers Ltd., October 1976)
 The Legend of the 7 Golden Vampires, The House of Hammer #4 (Top Sellers Ltd., January 1977)
 Dracula: Prince of Darkness, The House of Hammer #6 (Top Sellers Ltd., March 1977)
 The Brides of Dracula, Halls of Horror #27—28 (Quality Communications, 1983)
 Dragonheart #1—2 (Topps Comics, May—June 1996)
 Dragonslayer, Marvel Super Special #20 (Marvel Comics, October 1981)
 Dragoon Wells Massacre, Four Color (Volume 2) #815 (Dell Comics, July 1957)
 Drum Beat, Four Color (Volume 2) #610 (Dell Comics, January 1955)
 DuckTales the Movie: Treasure of the Lost Lamp (Disney Comics, Summer 1990) ISBN: 
 Dumbo:
 Dumbo the Flying Elephant, (Four Color (Volume 2) #17 (Dell Comics, 1941)
 "Dumbo/Seven Dwarfs story", Walt Disney's Comics and Stories #61 (Dell Comics, October 1945)
 Dumbo in Sky Voyage, Four Color (Volume 2) #234 (Dell Comics, July 1949)
 Dune:
 Dune (1984), Marvel Super Special #36 (Marvel Comics, April 1985)
 Dune: The Official Movie Graphic Novel, based on the 2021 film (Legendary Comics, December 2022)

E
 East Side of Heaven, Movie Comics #3 (Fawcett Comics, June 1939)
 Edison's Frankenstein 1910 (Comic Library International, 2003)
 Edward Scissorhands #1–10 (IDW Publishing, October 2014—July 2015)
 El Cid, Four Color (Volume 2) #1259 (Dell Comics, 1961)
 El Dorado, Dell Movie Classics #240 (Dell Comics, October 1967)
 Emil and the Detectives (Gold Key Comics, February 1965)
 Ensign Pulver, Dell Movie Classics #257 (Dell Comics, August-October 1964)

Escape from New York

Everything's Ducky

Evil Dead

Army of Darkness

The Evil Dead

Freddy vs. Jason vs. Ash

Evil Dead 2

The Expendables

F
 The Fall of the Roman Empire (Gold Key Comics, July 1964)
 The Family Next Door, Movie Comics #5 (DC Comics, August 1939)
 Fantastic Voyage (Gold Key Comics, January 1966)
 The Fastest Gun Alive, Four Color (Volume 2) #741 (Dell Comics, September 1956)
 The FBI Story, Four Color (Volume 2) #1069 (Dell Comics, November 1959)
 Fearless Fagan, Four Color (Volume 2) #441 (Dell Comics, December 1952)
 The Fighting Prince of Donegal (Gold Key Comics, January 1967)
 Final Destination:
 Final Destination: Sacrifice (Zenescope Entertainment, July 2006)
 Final Destination: Spring Break #1—5 (Zenescope Entertainment, March 2006—April 2007)
 Finding Nemo:
 Disney Junior Graphic Novel #1: Finding Nemo (Disney Press, August 2006) 
 Finding Nemo: Reef Rescue #1—4 (Boom! Studios, May—July 2099)
 Finding Nemo: Losing Dory #1—4 (Boom! Studios, July—October 2010)
 Finding Nemo (manga adaptation of the film) (Tokyopop, June 2016)
 Finding Nemo: The Story of the Movie in Comics (Dark Horse Comics, October 2020)
 First Men in the Moon (Gold Key Comics, March 1965)
 Fisherman's Wharf, Movie Comics #1 (DC Comics, April 1939)
 Five Came Back, Movie Comics #5 (DC Comics, August 1939)
 The Flintstones: The Official Movie Adaptation in Double Vision (Harvey Comics, September 1994)
 The Fly: Outbreak #1—5 (IDW Publishing, March—July 2015)
 Flying Saucers vs. the Earth #1—4, based on Earth vs. the Flying Saucers (TidalWave Productions, April—July 2008)
 Forever, Darling, Four Color (Volume 2) #681 (Dell Comics, 1956)
 The Fountain, based on the 2006 film of the same title (Vertigo, November 2005)
 Four Days Leave, Movie Love #3 (Eastern Color Printing, 1950)
 Four Faces West, Cowboy Western Comics #24 (Charlton Comics, August 1949)
 The Four Feathers, Movie Comics #3 (Fawcett Comics, June 1939)
 The Fox and the Hound #1—3 (Gold Key Comics, August—October 1981)
 Frankenstein, Dell Movie Classics #283 (Dell Comics, March-May 1963)
 Freaked (Hamilton Comics, 1993)
 Freaks #1—4 (Monster Comics, May 1992—March 1993) 
 Freejack #1—3 (NOW Comics, April—June 1992)
 Friday the 13th:
 Jason Goes to Hell: The Final Friday #1—3 (Topps Comics, July—September 1993)
 Jason vs. Leatherface #1—3 (Topps Comics, October 1995—January 1996)
 Friday the 13th: Bloodbath (Avatar Press, 2005)
 Jason X (Avatar Press, 2005)
 Friday the 13th: Jason vs. Jason X (Avatar Press, 2006)
 Friday the 13th: Fearbook (Avatar Press, 2006)
 Friday the 13th: Pamela's Tale (WildStorm, 2007)
 Friday the 13th: How I Spent My Summer Vacation (WildStorm, 2007)
 Friday the 13th: Bad Land (WildStorm, 2008)
 Friday the 13th: Abuser and the Abused (WildStorm, 2008)
 Fright Night:
 Fright Night  #1—22 (NOW Comics, October 1988—July 1990); Specials (NOW Comics, June 1992—December 1993)
 Fright Night Part II (NOW Comics, 1988)
 From Dusk till Dawn (Big Entertainment, May 1996)
 Fun and Fancy Free:
 "Bongo, The Runaway Circus Bear", Walt Disney's Comics and Stories #82 (Dell Comics, July 1947)
 "Bongo Meets Lumpjaw", Walt Disney's Comics and Stories #83 (Dell Comics, August 1947)
 "Bongo Finds a Home", Walt Disney's Comics and Stories #84 (Dell Comics, September 1947)
 Bongo and Lumpjaw, Four Color (Volume 2) #706, #886, (Dell Comics, June 1956, March 1958)
 Future Shock #1 (Sci-Fi Comix, 1993)

Flesh Gordon

G
 Galaxina #1—4 (Aircel Comics, December 1991—February 1992)
 Galaxy Quest:
 Galaxy Quest: Global Warning #1—5 (IDW Publishing, August—December 2008)
 Galaxy Quest: The Journey Continues #1—4 (IDW Publishing, January—April 2015)
Gay Purr-ee (Gold Key Comics, January 1963)
 Ghostbusters: 
 The Real Ghostbusters — Starring in Ghostbusters II #1—3 (NOW Comics, 1989)
 Ghostbusters: Legion #1—4 (88MPH Studios, February 2004—January 2005)
 Teenage Mutant Ninja Turtles/Ghostbusters #1—4 (IDW Publishing, October 2014—January 2015) 
 Ghostbusters: Answer the Call #1—5 (IDW Publishing, 2017—2018)
 Teenage Mutant Ninja Turtles/Ghostbusters 2 #1—5 (IDW Publishing, November 2017)
 Transformers/Ghostbusters #1—5 (IDW Publishing, 2020—2021)
 G.I. Joe:
 G.I. Joe: The Rise of Cobra — Official Movie Prequel #1—4 (IDW Publishing, March—June 2009)
 G.I. Joe: The Rise of Cobra — Official Movie Adaptation #1—4 (IDW Publishing, July 2009)
 G.I. Joe: Retaliation — Official Movie Prequel #1—4 (IDW Publishing, February—April 2012) 
 The Girl and the Gambler, Movie Comics #5 (DC Comics, August 1939)
 Glory Alley, Movie Love #17 (Eastern Color Printing, October 1952)
 The Gnome-Mobile (Gold Key Comics, October 1967)
 Goodbye, Mr. Chips (Gold Key Comics, June 1970)
 Godzilla
 The Golden Voyage of Sinbad: Land of the Lost, Worlds Unknown #7—8 (Marvel Comics, June—August 1974)
 Gorgo, Gorgo #1—23 (Charlton Comics, May 1961—September 1965)
 The Gorgon, The House of Hammer #11—12 (Top Sellers Ltd., August—September 1977)
 The Great Locomotive Chase, Four Color (Volume 2) #712 (Dell Comics, July 1956)
 The Great Man Votes, Movie Comics #1 (DC Comics, April 1939)
 The Great Mouse Detective
 The Great Race, Dell Movie Classics #299 (Dell Comics, March 1966)
 The Green Glove, Movie Love #15 (Eastern Color Printing, June 1952)
 The Green Hornet:
 The Green Hornet: Parallel Lives #1—5 (Dynamite Entertainment, June—November 2010)
 The Green Hornet: Aftermath #1—4 (Dynamite Entertainment, April—July 2011)
 Gremlins: The Illustrated Adaptation of the Hit Movie (Western Publishing, 1984)
 Greyfriars Bobby, Four Color (Volume 2) #1189 (Dell Comics, November 1961)
 Gun Glory, Four Color (Volume 2) #846 (Dell Comics, October 1957)
 Gunga Din, Movie Comics #1 (DC Comics, April 1939)
 Gypsy Colt, Four Color (Volume 2) #568 (Dell Comics, June 1954)

H
 The Hallelujah Trail, Dell Movie Classics #307 (Dell Comics, February 1966)
 Halloween:
 Halloween #1 (Chaos! Comics, November 2000)
 Halloween II: The Blackest Eyes #1 (Chaos! Comics, April 2001)
 Halloween III: The Devil's Eyes #1 (Chaos! Comics, November 2001)
 Halloween: One Good Scare (2003)
 Halloween: Autopsis (Paranormal Pictures, 2006)
 Halloween: Nightdance #1—4 (Devil's Due Publishing, February—May 2008)
 Halloween: 30 Years of Terror (Devil's Due Publishing, August 2008)
 Halloween: The First Death of Laurie Strode #1—2 (Devil's Due Publishing, September—November 2008)
 Hansel and Gretel, Four Color (Volume 2) #590 (Dell Comics, October 1954)
 The Happiest Millionaire (Gold Key Comics, April 1968)
 Hatari!, Dell Movie Classics #340 (Dell Comics, January 1963)
 Helen of Troy, Four Color (Volume 2) #684 (Dell Comics, March 1956)
 He-Man and She-Ra in The Secret of the Sword (Mattel, 1985)
 Herbie:
 The Love Bug (Gold Key Comics, June 1969)
 Herbie Rides Again, Walt Disney Showcase #24 (Gold Key Comics, August 1974)
 Herbie Goes to Monte Carlo, Walt Disney Showcase #41 (Gold Key Comics, October 1977)
 Herbie: Fully Loaded, Disney Adventures Comic Zone (Disney Publishing Worldwide, Summer 2005)
 Hercules (1958 film series):
 Hercules, Four Color (Volume 2) #1006 (Dell Comics, July 1959)
 Hercules Unchained, Four Color (Volume 2) #1121 (Dell Comics, August 1960)
 Hercules: Official Comics Movie Adaptation (Acclaim Comics, July 1997) 
 Hey There, It's Yogi Bear! (Gold Key Comics, September 1964)
 Highlander:
 Highlander #0—12 (Dynamite Entertainment, July 2006—November 2007)
 Highlander: Way of the Sword #1—4 (Dynamite Entertainment, December 2007—April 2008)
 Highlander Origins: Kurgan #1—2 (Dynamite Entertainment, January—February 2009)
 Highlander 3030 (Emerald Star Comics, July 2015)
 Highlander: The American Dream #1—5 (IDW Publishing, February—June 2017)
 The Hills Have Eyes: The Beginning (Fox Atomic Comics, June 2007)
 Home #1—4 (Titan Comics, August—November 2015)
 Hong Kong, Movie Love #13 (Eastern Color Printing, February 1952)
 Hook #1—4 (Marvel Comics, February—March 1992)
 The Horizontal Lieutenant, Dell Movie Classics #348 (Dell Comics, October 1962)
 The Horse Soldiers, Four Color (Volume 2) #1048 (Dell Comics, September 1959)
 House II: The Second Story #1 (Marvel Comics, October 1987)
 The House of Fear, Movie Comics #5 (DC Comics, August 1939)
 How the West Was Won (Gold Key Comics, July 1963)
 Humanoids from the Deep #1 (TidalWave Productions, October 2010)
 The Hunchback of Notre Dame (1956), Four Color (Volume 2) #854) Dell Comics, July 1957)
 The Hunchback of Notre Dame (1996) (Marvel Comics, July 1996)

I
 I Aim at the Stars, Four Color #1148 (Dell Comics, October 1960)
 I Am Legend: Awakening (DC Comics/Vertigo Comics, 2007)
 I Love Melvin, Movie Love #20 (Eastern Color Printing, April 1953)
 Ice Age:
 Ice Age: Iced In (Boom! Studios/Kaboom!, December 2011)
 Ice Age: Playing Favorites (Boom! Studios/Kaboom!, March 2012)
 Ice Age: Where There's Thunder (Boom! Studios/Kaboom!, May 2012)
 Ice Age: Past, Presents and Future! (Boom! Studios/Kaboom!, October 2012)
 Ice Age: The Hidden Treasure (Boom! Studios/Kaboom!, Marcg 2013)
 If This Be Sin, Movie Love #2 (Eastern Color Printing, April 1950)
 Igor:
 Igor: Movie Prequel #1—4 (IDW Publishing, May—August 2008)
 Igor: Movie Adaptation #1—4 (IDW Publishing, August—September 2008)
 In Old Monterey, Movie Comics #6 (DC Comics, October 1939)
 In Search of the Castaways (Gold Key Comics, 1962)
 Inception: The Cobol Job (Warner Bros., December 2010)
 The Incredible Mr. Limpet, Dell Movie Classics #370 (Dell Comics, August 1964)
 The Incredibles:
 The Incredibles #1—4, adaptation of the film (Dark Horse Comics, November 2004—February 2005)
 "Every Day It'll Be the Same Old Story!", Disney Adventures (Disney Publishing Worldwide, November 2004)
 "Trick or Treat!", Disney Adventures (Disney Publishing Worldwide, April 2005)
 "Diamond Disaster!", Disney Adventures (Disney Publishing Worldwide, June/July 2005)
 The Incredibles (Volume 1) #1—4 (Boom! Studios, May—June 2009)
 The Incredibles (Volume 2) #0—17 (Boom! Studios, July 2009—October 2010)
 Incredibles 2: Crisis in Mid-Life! & Other Stories #1—3 (Dark Horse Comics, July—September 2018)
 Incredibles 2: Secret Identities #1—3 (Dark Horse Comics, April—June 2019)
 Incredibles 2: Slow Burn #1—3 (Dark Horse Comics, February—April 2020)
 "Date Night" (Minecraft and Incredibles FCDB, Dark Horse Comics, May 2019) 
 Independence Day:
 Independence Day #0—2 (Marvel Comics, 1996)
 Independence Day: Dark Fathom #1—5 (Titan Comics, March—June 2016)
 The Indian Fighter, Four Color (Volume 2) #687 (Dell Comics, March 1956)
 Indiana Jones:
 Raiders of the Lost Ark, Marvel Comics Super Special #18 (Marvel Comics, September 1981)
 The Further Adventures of Indiana Jones #1—34 (Marvel Comics, January 1983—March 1986)
 Indiana Jones and the Temple of Doom, Marvel Comics Super Special #30 (Marvel Comics, August 1984)
 Indiana Jones and the Last Crusade #1—4 (Marvel Comics, October—November 1989)
 Indiana Jones and the Fate of Atlantis #1—4 (Dark Horse Comics, March—September 1991)
 Indiana Jones: Thunder in the Orient #1—6 (Dark Horse Comics, September 1993—April 1994)
 Indiana Jones and the Arms of Gold #1—4 (Dark Horse Comics, February—May 1994)
 Indiana Jones and the Golden Fleece #1—2 (Dark Horse Comics, June—July 1994)
 Indiana Jones and the Shrine of the Sea Devil, Dark Horse Comics #3—6, (Dark Horse Comics, October 1992—January 1993)
 Indiana Jones and the Iron Phoenix #1—4 (Dark Horse Comics, December 1994—March 1995)
 Indiana Jones and the Spear of Destiny #1—4 (Dark Horse Comics, April—July 1995)
 Indiana Jones and the Sargasso Pirates #1—4 (Dark Horse Comics, December 1995—March 1996)
 Indiana Jones and the Kingdom of the Crystal Skull #1—2 (Dark Horse Comics, May 2008)
 Indiana Jones and the Tomb of the Gods #1—4 (Dark Horse Comics, June 2008—March 2009)
 Invaders from Mars:
 Invaders from Mars! #1—3 (Eternity Comics, February—April 1990)
 Invaders from Mars Book II #1—3 (Eternity Comics, June—August 1991)
 The Iron Giant (DC Comics, 1999)
 The Island at the Top of the World, Walt Disney Showcase #27 (Gold Key Comics, 1975)
 The Island of Dr. Moreau (Marvel Comics, October 1977)
 It! The Terror from Beyond Space:
 It! The Terror from Beyond Space (1992) #1—3 (Millennium Publications, November 1992—February 1993)
 Midnite Movies: It! The Terror from Beyond Space (2010) #1—3 (IDW Publishing, June—September 2010)
 It Came from Beneath the Sea... Again!, based on It Came from Beneath the Sea (TidalWave Productions, 2011)
 Ivanhoe, Fawcett Movie Comic #20 (Fawcett Comics, December 1952)

J
 Jack the Giant Killer, Dell Movie Classics #374 (Dell Comics, January 1963)
 James Bond:
 Dr. No, Classics Illustrated #158A (Thorpe & Porter, December 1962)
 For Your Eyes Only, Marvel Comics Super Special #19 (Marvel Comics, October 1981)
 Octopussy, Marvel Comics Super Special #26 (Marvel Comics, September 1983)
 Licence to Kill (Acme Press/Eclipse Comics, November 1989)
 GoldenEye #00 + #1 (Topps Comics, January 1996)
Jason and the Argonauts:
 Jason and the Argonauts, Dell Movie Classics #376 (Dell Comics, August-October 1963)
 Jason and the Argonauts: The Kingdom of Hades (TidalWave Productions, 2007)
 Jason and the Argonauts: Final Chorus (TidalWave Productions, 2014)
Jaws 2, Marvel Comics Super Special #6 (Marvel Comics, December 1978)
 John Carter: World of Mars (Marvel Comics, December 2011—March 2012)
 John Paul Jones, Four Color (Volume 2) #1007 (Dell Comics, September 1959)
 John Wick (Dynamite Entertainment, November 2017—February 2019)
 Johnny Tremain:
 Paul Revere's Ride with Johnny Tremain, Four Color (Volume 2) #822 (Dell Comics, 1957)
 Old Ironsides with Johnny Tremain, Four Color (Volume 2) #874 (Dell Comics, 1957) 
 Journey to the Center of the Earth, Four Color (Volume 2) #1060 (Dell Comics, November 1959)
 The Jungle Book:
 The Jungle Book (Whitman Publishing, January 1968)
 Baloo and Little Britches (Mowgli) (Gold Key Comics, April 1968)
 King Louie and Mowgli (Little Britches) (Gold Key Comics, May 1968)
Jurassic Park:
 Jurassic Park (1993) #1—4 (Topps Comics, June—August 1993, November 1993)
 Jurassic Park: Raptor #1—2 (Topps Comics, November—December 1993)
 Jurassic Park: Raptors Attack #1—4 (Topps Comics, March—June 1994)
 Jurassic Park Adventures #1—10 (Topps Comics, June 1994—February 1995)
 Jurassic Park: Raptors Hijack #1—4 (Topps Comics, July—October 1994)
 Jurassic Park Annual #1 (Topps Comics, May 1995)
 Return to Jurassic Park #1—9 (Topps Comics, April 1995—February 1996)
 The Lost World: Jurassic Park #1—4 (Topps Comics, May—August 1997)
 Jurassic Park: Redemption (IDW Publishing, June—October 2010)
 Jurassic Park: The Devils in the Desert (IDW Publishing, January—April 2011)
 Jurassic Park: Dangerous Games (IDW Publishing, September 2011—January 2012)
 Just This Once, Movie Love #14 (Eastern Color Printing, April 1952)

K
 Kidnapped, Four Color (Volume 2) #1101 (Dell Comics, May 1960)
 King Kong:
 El hijo de King-Kong, based on The Son of Kong (Aventuras del FBI #57, Editorial Rollán, S. A., July 1953)
 King Kong (1968), based on the 1933 film (Gold Key Comics, September 1968)
 Kingu Kongu (1976), based on the 1976 film (Monthly Shōnen Magazine, Kodansha, October—November 1976)
 King Kong (1991), based on the 1933 film (Monster Comics, February 1991—March 1992)
 King Kong: The 8th Wonder of the World, based on the 2005 film (Dark Horse Comics, December 2006)
 King of Kings, Four Color (Volume 2) #1236 (Dell Comics, 1961)
 King of the Turf, Movie Comics #2 (Fawcett Comics, May 1939)
 King Richard and the Crusaders, Four Color (Volume 2) #588 (Dell Comics, October 1954)
 Knights of the Round Table, Four Color (Volume 2) #540 (Dell Comics, March 1954)
 Konga, Konga #1—23 (Charlton Comics, 1960—November 1965)
 Krull, Marvel Comics Super Special #28 (Marvel Comics, October 1983)
 Kung Fu Panda #1—4 (Titan Comics, October—January 2016)

L
 Labyrinth:
 Labyrinth, Marvel Comics Super Special #40 (Marvel Comics, October 1986)
 Return to Labyrinth #1—4 (Tokyopop, 2006—2010)
 Labyrinth 30th Anniversary Special #1 (Archaia Entertainment, August 2016)
 Labyrinth 2017 Special #1 (Archaia Entertainment, November 2017)
 Labyrinth: Coronation #1—12 (Boom! Studios/Archaia Entertainment, February 2018—March 2019) 
 Labyrinth: Under the Spell #1 (Boom! Studios/Archaia Entertainment, November 2018)
 Labyrinth: Masquerade #1 (Boom! Studios/Archaia Entertainment, December 2020)
 Lad: A Dog, Four Color (Volume 2) #1303 (Dell Comics, 1962)
 Lady and the Tramp:
 Lady and the Tramp with Jock, Four Color (Volume 2) #629 (Dell Comics, May 1955)
 Lady and the Tramp, Dell Giant #1 (Dell Comics, June 1955)
 Lady and the Tramp Album, Four Color (Volume 2) #634 (Dell Comics, 1955)
 "Butter Late Than Never", giveaway promo for American Dairy Association (Western Publishing, 1955)
 Scamp (Dell Comics/Gold Key Comics, May 1956—January 1979)
Lancelot and Guinevere, Dell Movie Classics #416 (Dell Comics, October 1963)
 The Land Before Time: The 3-D Adventure, based on The Land Before Time franchise (Kitchen Sink Press, October 1996)
 The Land That Time Forgot, Marvel Movie Premiere #1 (Marvel Comics, September 1975)
 The Land Unknown, Four Color (Volume 2) #845 (Dell Comics, August 1957)
 Lash LaRue:
 King of the Bull Whip, Fawcett Movie Comic #9 (Fawcett Comics, December 1950)
 The Thundering Trail, Fawcett Movie Comic #12 (Fawcett Publications, June 1951)
 The Vanishing Outpost, Motion Picture Comics #111 (Fawcett Comics, May 1951)
 The Last Airbender:
 The Last Airbender Prequel: Zuko's Story (Del Rey Manga, May 2010)
 The Last Airbender (Del Rey Manga, June 2010)
 The Last Hunt, Four Color (Volume 2) #678 (Dell Comics, February 1956)
 The Last of the Fast Guns, Four Color (Volume 2) #925 (Dell Comics, 1958)
 The Last Outpost Fawcett Movie Comic #14, (Fawcett Comics, December 1951)
 The Last Starfighter, Marvel Comics Super Special #31 (Marvel Comics, September 1984)
 Last Train from Gun Hill, Four Color (Volume 2) #1012 (Dell Comics, July 1959)
 Lawrence of Arabia, Dell Movie Classics #426 (Dell Comics, August 1963)
 The Left Handed Gun, Four Color (Volume 2) #913 (Dell Comics, July 1958)
 The Legend of Lobo (Gold Key Comics, March 1963)
 Leprechaun #1—4 (TidalWave Productions, May—August 2009)
 Let's Dance, Movie Love #7 (Eastern Color Printing, February 1951)
 A Life Less Ordinary, 2000 AD #1063—1070 (Egmont UK, October—November 1997)
 The Light in the Forest, Four Color (Volume 2) #891 (Dell Comics, 1958)
 The Lion (Gold Key Comics, January 1963)
 The Lion King #1—2 (Marvel Comics, July—August 1994)
 Lion of Sparta, Dell Movie Classics #439 (Dell Comics, January 1963)
 The Little Mermaid:
 The Little Mermaid: The Official Movie Adaptation (W. D. Publications, Inc., 1991)
 The Little Mermaid #1—4 (Disney Comics, February 1992—June 1992)
 Sebastian #1—2 (Disney Comics, 1992)
 The Little Mermaid (2019) #1—3 (Dark Horse Comics, October 2019—February 2020)
 Little Monsters (NOW Comics, January—June 1990)
 The Little Shop of Horrors:
 Little Shop of Horrors, based on the 1986 film (DC Comics, March 1987)
 Welcome to the Little Shop of Horrors, based on the 1960 film (Roger Corman's Cosmic Comics, May—July 1995)
 The Littlest Outlaw, Four Color (Volume 2) #609 (Dell Comics, November 1954)
 Logan's Run #1—7 (Marvel Comics, January—July 1977)
 The Lone Ranger Movie Story, Dell Giant #1 (Dell Comics, March 1956)
 Looney Tunes and Merrie Melodies:
 Space Jam (DC Comics, 1996)
 Looney Tunes: Back in Action — The Official Comic Book Adaptation (DC Comics, December 2003)
 Space Jam: A New Legacy (DC Comics, June 2021)
 Lord Jim (Gold Key Comics, September 1965)
 The Lost Boys:
 Lost Boys: Reign of Frogs #1—4 (Wildstorm, May—August 2008)
 The Lost Boys #1—6 (Vertigo, December 2016—May 2017)
 Lost in Space #1—3 (Dark Horse Comics, April—July 1998)
 The Lost World, Four Color (Volume 2) #1145 (Dell Comics, August 1960)
 Love Laughs at Andy Hardy, Movie Comics #3 (Fiction House, June 1947)
 Lt. Robin Crusoe, U.S.N. (Gold Key Comics, October 1966)
Luana (Sol Fried, 1973)

M
 M #1–4 (Eclipse Comics, 1990)
 Machete #0 (IDW Publishing, September 2010)
 Mad Monster Party?, Dell Movie Classics #460 (Dell Comics, September 1967)
 Mad Max: Fury Road, based on Mad Max (Vertigo, May—August 2015)
 Madagascar:
 Shrek/Penguins of Madagascar Flipbook (Free Comic Book Day exclusive, Ape Entertainment, May 2010) 
 Madagascar 3: Long Live the King! (Ape Entertainment, June 2012)
 Penguins of Madagascar (Ape Entertainment, December 2014—March 2015)
 Madagascar (Joe Books Ltd., March—June 2016)
 The Magic Sword, Dell Movie Classics #496 (Dell Comics, September 1962)
 The Man from Planet X, Fawcett Movie Comic #15 (Fawcett Comics, February 1952)
 The Man in the Iron Mask, Movie Comics #5 (DC Comics, August 1939)
 The Man Who Fell to Earth (Titan Comics, October 2022) 
 Man with the Screaming Brain (Dark Horse Comics, April—July 2005)
 Maria d'Oro und Bello Blue (Gevacur AG, 1973)
 Mary Poppins (Gold Key Comics, 1964)
 Mary Shelley's Frankenstein: Official Comics Adaptation of the Kenneth Branagh Film #1—4 (Topps Comics, October 1994—January 1995)
 Mask of the Avenger, Motion Picture Comics #108 (Fawcett Comics, January 1952)
 The Masque of the Red Death, Dell Movie Classics #490 (Dell Comics, August-October 1964)
 Master of the World, Four Color (Volume 2) #1157 (Dell Comics, 1961)
 Masters of the Universe: The Motion Picture #1 (Marvel Comics/Star Comics, November 1987)
 The Mating Season, Movie Love #9 (Eastern Color Printing, June 1951)
 The Matrix:
 The Matrix: Comic Book Preview (Warner Bros., March 1999)
 The Matrix Comics Vols. 1—2 (Burlyman Entertainment, July 2003, October 2003—December 2004)
 Maya, Dell Movie Classics #495 (Dell Comics, December 1966)
 McHale's Navy, Dell Movie Classics #500 (Dell Comics, October-December 1964)
 McLintock! (Gold Key Comics, March 1964)
 Meet the Robinsons:
 "Meet the Mysterious… Bowler Hat Guy?!?", Disney Adventures (March 2007)
 "Robo-Mildred!", Disney Adventures (April 2007)
 "Snow Problem!", Disney Adventures (May 2007)
 "Carl/Franny story", Disney Adventures (June/July 2007)
 "Carl story", Disney Adventures (June/July 2007)
 Merlin Jones:
 The Misadventures of Merlin Jones (Gold Key Comics, May 1964)
 Merlin Jones as The Monkey's Uncle (Gold Key Comics, October 1965)
 Merrill's Marauders, Dell Movie Classics #510 (Dell Comics, January 1963)
 Merton of the Movies, Movie Comics #4 (Fiction House, 1947)
 Meteor, Marvel Comics Super Special #14 (Marvel Comics, February 1980)
 Meteor Man (Marvel Comics, April 1993; July—January 1994)
 Mexicali Rose, Movie Comics #3 (DC Comics, June 1939)
 MGM's Marvelous Wizard of Oz (DC Comics/Marvel Comics, 1975)
 Mickey Mouse:
 Mickey Mouse and the Beanstalk, Four Color (Volume 2) #157 (Dell Comics, 1947)
 "The Sorcerer's Apprentice", Silly Symphonies #2 (Dell Comics, 1953)
 The Prince and the Pauper (W. D. Publications, Inc., November 1990)
 Mickey, Donald, Goofy: The Three Musketeers (Gemstone Publishing, September 2004)
 Runaway Brain, Mickey Mouse and Friends #269 (Gemstone Publishing, October 2004)
 A Christmas Carol Starring Scrooge McDuck (Dark Horse Comics, September 2019)
 Midnite Movies: Motel Hell (2010) #1—3, based on Motel Hell (IDW Publishing, October—December 2010)
 Minions (from Despicable Me):
 Minions #1—2 (Titan Comics, July—August 2015)
 Minions: Paella! #1—2 (Titan Comics, November—December 2019)
 Minions: Sports! #1—2 (Titan Comics, April—May 2021)
 The Mikado, Movie Comics #3 (DC Comics, June 1939)
 Miracle of the White Stallions (Gold Key Comics, June 1963)
 Missile to the Moon #1 (TidalWave Productions, January 2009)
 The Missourians, Fawcett Movie Comic #11 (Fawcett Comics, April 1951)
 Mister Universe, Movie Love #6 (Eastern Color Printing, December 1950)
 Moby Dick, Four Color (Volume 2) #717 (Dell Comics, August 1956)
 The Monster Club (Pioneer Press, 1980)
 Monster House (IDW Publishing, June 2006)
 Monsters, Inc.:
 Monsters, Inc. (2001) (first adaptation of the film) (Dark Horse Comics, October 2001)
 Monsters, Inc.: Laugh Factory (Boom! Studios, June—November 2009)
 Monsters, Inc.: The Story of the Movie in Comics (Marvel Comics, February—March 2013)
 Monsters, Inc.: A Perfect Date (Marvel Comics, February 2013)
 Monsters, Inc.: The Humanween Party (Marvel Comics, April 2013)
 Monsters University: Official Movie Magazine (Marvel Comics, June 2013)
 Monsters, Inc. (manga adaptation of the film) (Tokyopop, December 2018)
 Montana (Fawcett Comics, 1950)
 Moon Pilot, Four Color (Volume 2) #1313 (Dell Comics, 1962)
 The Moon-Spinners (Gold Key Comics, October 1964)
 Moon Zero Two, The House of Hammer #5 (Top Sellers Ltd., February 1977)
 Moonwalker 3-D, Blackthorne 3-D Series #75 (Blackthorne Publishing, 1989)
 Morgan, the Pirate, Four Color (Volume 2) #1227 (Dell Comics, 1961)
 The Mouse on the Moon, Dell Movie Classics #530 (Dell Comics, October-December 1963)
 Mr. Peabody and Sherman #1—5 (IDW Publishing, November 2013—January 2014)
 Mrs. Mike, Movie Love #1 (Eastern Color Printing, February 1950)
 The Mummy:
 The Mummy (1962), based on the 1932 film, Dell Movie Classics #537 (Dell Comics, September-November 1962)
 The Mummy's Shroud, The House of Hammer #15 (Top Sellers Ltd., December 1977)
 The Mummy (adaptation of the 1959 film), The House of Hammer #22 (Top Sellers Ltd., July 1978)
 The Mummy (1991), based on the 1932 film (Monster Comics, March—October 1991)
 The Mummy: Valley of the Gods (Chaos! Comics, May 2001)
 The Mummy: The Rise and Fall of Xango's Ax #1–4 (IDW Publishing, April—July 2008)
 The Mummy: Palimpsest, based on the Hammer film series (Titan Comics, December 2016—May 2017)  
 The Muppets Take Manhatttan, Marvel Comics Super Special #32 (Marvel Comics, October 1984)
 The Music Man, Dell Movie Classics #538 (Dell Comics, January 1963) 
 Mutiny, Movie Love #16, (Eastern Color Printing, August 1952)
Mutiny on the Blackhawk, Movie Comics #6 (DC Comics, October 1939)
 Mutiny on the Bounty (Gold Key Comics, February 1963)
 Mysterious Island:
 Mysterious Island, Four Color (Volume 2) #1213 (Dell Comics, 1961)
 Back to Mysterious Island #1–4 (TidalWave Productions, July—October 2008)
 Mystery Men: Movie Adaptation #1–2 (Dark Horse Comics, July—August 1999)
 Mystery of the White Room, Movie Comics #3 (Fawcett Comics, June 1939)

N
 The Naked Prey, Dell Movie Classics #545 (Dell Comics, December 1966)
 Napoleon and Samantha, Walt Disney Showcase #10 (Gold Key Comics, September 1972)
 Napoleon Dynamite Regular series #1–4 (IDW Publishing, September—December 2019); Valentine's Day Special (IDW Publishing, February 2020)
 Navy Secrets, Movie Comics #3 (Fawcett Comics, June 1939)
 New Mexico, Movie Love #8 (Eastern Color Printing, April 1951)
 The Night of the Grizzly, Dell Movie Comics #558 (Dell Comics, December 1966)
 Night of the Living Dead:
 Night of the Living Dead #1–4 (FantaCo Enterprises, November 1991—October 1992)
 George A. Romero's Dawn of the Dead (IDW Publishing, April—June 2004)
 The Death of Death (Toe Tags — Featuring George A. Romero #1—6, DC Comics, December 2004—May 2005)
 George A. Romero's Land of the Dead (IDW Publishing, September 2005—January 2006) 
 Escape of the Living Dead (Avatar Press, September 2005—March 2006)
 Plague of the Living Dead (Avatar Press, April—October 2007)
 Empire of the Dead (Marvel Comics, March 2014—November 2015)
 A Nightmare on Elm Street:
 Freddy Krueger's A Nightmare on Elm Street #1–2 (Marvel Comics, October—November 1989)
 Nightmares on Elm Street #1–6 (Innovation Publishing, September 1991—July 1992)
 Freddy's Dead: The Final Nightmare #1–3 (Innovation Publishing, October—December 1991)
 A Nightmare on Elm Street: The Beginning #1–2 (Innovation Publishing, 1992)
 A Nightmare on Elm Street Special #1 (Avatar Press, April 2005)
 A Nightmare on Elm Street: Paranoid #1–3 (Avatar Press, November 2005—June 2006)
 A Nightmare on Elm Street: Fearbook #1 (Avatar Press, June 2006)
 A Nightmare on Elm Street #1–8 (DC Comics/WildStorm, December 2006—August 2007)
 "Copycat", New Line Cinema's Tales of Horror #1 (DC Comics/WildStorm, November 2007)
 Nikki: Wild Dog of the North, Four Color #1226 (Dell Comics, 1961)
 Ninja Scroll (WildStorm, November 2006—October 2007)
 "No Sleep till Dawn": The Story of Bombers B-52, Four Color (Volume 2) #831 (Dell Comics, September 1957)
 No Time for Sergeants, Four Color (Volume 2) #914 (Dell Comics, July 1958)
 None but the Brave, Dell Movie Classics #565 (Dell Comics, April-June 1965)
 The North Avenue Irregulars, Walt Disney Showcase #49 (Gold Key Comics, March 1979)
 North to Alaska, Four Color (Volume 2) #1155 (Dell Comics, December 1960)
 Northwest Stampede, Cowboy Western Comics #25 (Charlton Comics, December 1949)
 Nosferatu:
 Nosferatu: Plague of Terror #1–4 (Millennium Publications, May—November 1991)
 Nosferatu (1991) #1–2 (Tome Press, July—August 1991)
 Nosferatu: The Death Mass #1–4 (Venus Comics, December 1997—March 1998)
 Batman: Nosferatu (DC Comics, March 1999)
 Silent Screamers: Nosferatu 1922 (Image Comics, October 2000)
 Nosferatu (2010) (Viper Comics, December 2010)
 Nosferatu! (Toonhound Studios, December 2019)
 Nyoka the Jungle Girl, Jungle Girl — Featuring the Perils of Nyoka #1 (Fawcett Comics, September 1942); First series #2—77 (Fawcett Comics, Winter 1942—June 1953); Second series #14—22 (Charlton Comics, November 1955—November 1957); The Further Adventures #1—7 (AC Comics, 1988—2005)

O
 The Oklahoman, Four Color (Volume 2) #820 (Dell Comics, June 1957)
 The Old Frontier, Fawcett Movie Comic #10 (Fawcett Comics, February 1951)
 Old Yeller, Four Color (Volume 2) #869 (Dell Comics, 1957)
 On the Double, Four Color (Volume 2) #1232 (Dell Comics, 1961)
 One Million Years B.C., The House of Hammer #14 (Top Sellers Ltd., November 1977)
 Operation Bikini, Dell Movie Classics #597 (Dell Comics, October 1963)
 Operation Crossbow, Dell Movie Classics #590 (Dell Comics, October-December 1965)
 Operation Secret, Movie Love #18 (Eastern Color Printing, December 1952)
 The Oregon Trail, Movie Comics #4—6 (DC Comics, July—October 1939)
 Osamu Tezuka's Marine Express, based on Undersea Super Train: Marine Express (Homesha Books, September 2016—January 2018)
 Our Very Own, Movie Love #5 (Eastern Color Printing, October 1950)

P
 Pandora and the Flying Dutchman, Movie Love #11 (Eastern Color Printing, October 1951)
 The Parent Trap, Four Color (Volume 2) #1210 (Dell Comics, August 1961)
 Passage West, Movie Love #10 (Eastern Color Printing, August 1951)
 Pathfinder: An American Saga (Dark Horse Comics, July 2006)
 Pete's Dragon, Walt Disney Showcase #43 (Gold Key Comics, April 1978)
 Peter Pan:
 Peter Pan Treasure Chest, Dell Giant #1 (Dell Comics, January 1953)
 New Adventures of Peter Pan, giveaway promo for Admiral (Western Publishing, 1953)
 Peter Pan, Four Color (Volume 2) #442 (Dell Comics, 1953)
 Captain Hook and Peter Pan, Four Color (Volume 2) #446 (Dell Comics, 1953)
 Adventures of Tinker Bell, Four Color (Volume 2) #896 (Dell Comics, April—June 1959)
 The New Adventures of Tinker Bell, Four Color (Volume 2) #982 (Dell Comics, April—June 1959)
 The Phantom Creeps, Movie Comics #6 (DC Comics, October 1939)
 The Phantom Planet, Four Color (Volume 2) #1234 (Dell Comics, 1961)
 Pinocchio:
 Pinocchio, Walt Disney's Comics and Stories #63, #64 (Dell Comics, December 1945, January 1946)
 The Wonderful Adventures of Pinocchio, Four Color (Volume 2) #92 (Dell Comics, January 1946)
 "Pinocchio Learns About Kites", Reddy Kilowatt, Inc. premium (Western Publishing, 1953)
 Jiminy Cricket, Four Color (Volume 2) #701, #795, #897 and #989 (Dell Comics, May 1956, 1957, 1958 and May—July 1959)
 "Jiminy Cricket in The Reckless Rescuer", Silly Symphonies #7 (Dell Comics, February 1957)
 "Jiminy Cricket and the Big Little Show", Silly Symphonies #8 (Dell Comics, February 1958)
 Pinocchio and the Emperor of the Night #1 (Marvel Comics, March 1988)
 Pinocchio in Outer Space, Tintin #866 (Le Lombard, May 1965)
 Pioneer Marshal (Fawcett Comics, 1950)
 Pirates of the Caribbean:
 "Revenge of the Pirates!", Disney Adventures (Disney Publishing Worldwide, August 2003)
 "The Capture of Jack Sparrow!", Disney Adventures (Disney Publishing Worldwide, December/January 2004)
 "Legend of the Aztec Idol!", Disney Adventures (Disney Publishing Worldwide, Winter 2004)
 "In Jack We Trust!", Disney Adventures (Disney Publishing Worldwide, March 2004)
 "A Revolting Development!", Disney Adventures (Disney Publishing Worldwide, May 2004)
 "The Duel!", Disney Adventures (Disney Publishing Worldwide, August 2004)
 "Chain Reaction!", Disney Adventures (Disney Publishing Worldwide, February 2005)
 "Going Overboard!", Disney Adventures (Disney Publishing Worldwide, March 2005)
 "Enter... The Scarecrow!", Disney Adventures Comic Zone (Disney Publishing Worldwide, Winter 2005)
 "The Compass of Destiny! Part Two", Disney Adventures (Disney Publishing Worldwide, November 2006)
 Disney Junior Graphic Novel #4: Pirates of the Caribbean: Dead Man's Chest (Disney Press, May 2007) ISBN: 
 "Jailbreak!", Disney Adventures (Disney Publishing Worldwide, June/July 2007)
 "The Eye of Despair!", Disney Adventures (Disney Publishing Worldwide, October 2007)
 Disney Junior Graphic Novel #5: Pirates of the Caribbean: At World's End (Disney Press, October 2007) ISBN: 
 Pirates of the Caribbean: Beyond Port Royal #1—4 (Joe Books Inc., September 2016—February 2017)
 Pirates of the Caribbean: Dead Men Tell No Tales: Movie Graphic Novel (Joe Books Inc., June 2017) ISBN: 
 The Plague of the Zombies, The House of Hammer #13 (Top Sellers Ltd., October 1977)
 Plan 9 from Outer Space:
 Plan 9 from Outer Space #1 (Malibu Comics, October 1990)
 Plan 9 from Outer Space: Thirty Years Later! #1—3 (Eternity Comics, January—March 1991)
 Plan 9 from Outer Space Strikes Again! #1 (TidalWave Productions, March 2009)
 Planet of the Apes:
 Beneath the Planet of the Apes (1970) (Gold Key Comics, December 1970) 
 Planet of the Apes (adaptation of the 1968 film), Planet of the Apes #1—6, Marvel Comics, August 1974—March 1975)
 Beneath the Planet of the Apes (1975), Planet of the Apes #7—11, (Marvel Comics, April—August 1975)
 Escape from the Planet of the Apes, Planet of the Apes #12—16, (Marvel Comics, September 1975—January 1976)
 Conquest of the Planet of the Apes, Planet of the Apes #17—21 (Marvel Comics, February—June 1976)
 Battle for the Planet of the Apes, Planet of the Apes #23—28 (Marvel Comics, August 1976—January 1977)
 Ape Nation (Adventure Publications, February–June 1991)
 Planet of the Apes: The Human War (Dark Horse Comics, June—August 2001)
 Planet of the Apes (2001), An Official Adaptation of the Tim Burton Movie! (Dark Horse Comics, July 2001); Sequel limited series #1—6 (Dark Horse Comics, September 2001—February 2002)
 Dawn of the Planet of the Apes (Boom! Studios, November 2014—April 2015)
 Star Trek/Planet of the Apes: The Primate Directive (IDW Publishing/Boom! Studios, December 2014—April 2015)
 Tarzan on the Planet of the Apes (Dark Horse Comics/Boom! Studios, September 2016—January 2017)
 Planet of the Apes/Green Lantern (Boom! Studios/DC Comics, February—July 2017)
 War for the Planet of the Apes (Boom! Studios, July—October 2017)
 Kong on the Planet of the Apes (Boom! Studios, November 2017—April 2018)
 Pocahontas (Marvel Comics, June 1995)
 Pollyanna, Four Color (Volume 2) #1129 (Dell Comics, August 1960)
 Power Rangers:
 The Mighty Morphin' Power Rangers Movie Special (Marvel Comics, November 1995)
 Power Rangers: Aftershock (Boom! Studios, March 2017)
The Powerpuff Girls Movie — The Official Comic Book Adaptation! (DC Comics, July 2002)
 Predator:
 Predator (Dark Horse Comics, June 1989—present)
 Predator 2 #1—2 (Dark Horse Comics, February—June 1991)
 Batman Versus Predator #1—3 (DC Comics/Dark Horse Comics, December 1991—February 1992)
 Batman Versus Predator II: Bloodmatch #1—4 (DC Comics/Dark Horse Comics, October 1994—January 1995)
 Batman Versus Predator III: Blood Ties #1—4 (DC Comics/Dark Horse Comics, November 1997—February 1998)
 Predator versus Magnus, Robot Fighter #1—2 (Dark Horse Comics/Valiant Comics, November 1992)
 Tarzan vs. Predator: At the Earth's Core #1—4 (Dark Horse Comics, January—June, 1996)
 Predator vs. Judge Dredd #1—3 (Egmont/Dark Horse Comics, October—December 1997) 
 Superman vs. Predator #1—3 (DC Comics/Dark Horse Comics, May—July 2000)
 JLA vs. Predator #1 (DC Comics/Dark Horse Comics, February 2001)
 Predators, The Official Prequel #1—4 (Dark Horse Comics, June—July 2010); The Official Adaptation #1 (Dark Horse Comics, July 2010); The Official Sequel #0 (Dark Horse Comics, July 2010)
 Archie vs. Predator #1—4 (Dark Horse Comics/Archie Comics, April–July 2015)
 Archie vs. Predator II #1—5 (Dark Horse Comics/Archie Comics, July 2019–January 2020)
 The Pride and the Passion, Four Color (Volume 2) #824 (Dell Comics, August 1957)
 Prince of Persia: Before the Sandstorm (Disney Press, April 2010) ISBN:  / 
 Prince of Pirates, Movie Love #19 (Eastern Color Printing, February 1953)
 PT 109 (Gold Key Comics, September 1964)
 Puppet Master:
 Puppet Master — In Full Color! #1—4 (Eternity Comics, December 1990—May 1991)
 Puppet Master: Children of the Puppet Master #1—2 (Eternity Comics, August—September 1991)
 Push #1—6 (WildStorm, January—April 2009)

Q
 Quatermass:
 The Quatermass Xperiment, The House of Hammer #8—9 (Top Sellers Ltd., May—June 1977)
 Enemy from Space (Quatermass II), The House of Hammer #23 (Top Sellers Ltd., May 1978)
 Quebec, Movie Love #8 (Eastern Color Printing, April 1951)
 Quentin Durward, Four Color (Volume 2) #672 (Dell Comics, January 1956)
 Quest for Camelot (DC Comics, July 1998)

R
 Rainbow Brite and the Star Stealer (DC Comics, 1986)
 Rambo:
 Rambo III (Blackthorne Publishing, September 1988)
 Rambo (1989) (Blackthorne Publishing, February 1989)
 The Raven, Dell Movie Classics #680 (Dell Comics, September 1963)
 Razorback: Unleashed (Cult Fiction Comics, April 2004)
 The Real Glory, Movie Comics #6 (DC Comics, October 1939)
 Re-Animator:
 Re-Animator (1991) (Adventure Comics, October 1991—April 1992)
 Re-Animator: Dawn of the Re-Animator! (Adventure Comics, March—June 1992)
 Army of Darkness vs. Re-Animator (Dynamite Entertainment, October 2005—February 2006)
 Army of Darkness/Re-Animator (Dynamite Entertainment, October 2013)
 Re-Animator (2015) (Dynamite Entertainment, April—July 2015)
 Vampirella vs. Re-Animator (Dynamite Entertainment, December 2018—April 2019)
 The Army of Darkness versus Re-Animator: Necronomicon Rising (Dynamite Entertainment, July—November 2022)
 The Red Badge of Courage, Motion Picture Comics #105 (Fawcett Comics, July 1951)
 Red Heat (Blackthorne Publishing, July 1988)
 The Redhead and the Cowboy, Movie Love #9 (Eastern Color Printing, June 1951)
 The Reluctant Dragon, Four Color (Volume 1) #13 (Dell Comics, 1941)
 The Reptile, Hammer's House of Horror #19 (Top Sellers Ltd., February 1978)
 Reptilicus, Reptilicus #1—2 (Charlton Comics, August—October 1961)
 The Rescuers:
 The Rescuers, Walt Disney Showcase #40 (Gold Key Comics, September 1977)
 The Rescuers Down Under (W. D. Publications, Inc., 1991)
 Return to Oz (Scholastic, 1985) 
 Ring of Bright Water, Dell Movie Classics #701 (Dell Comics, October 1969)
 Rio Bravo, Four Color (Volume 2) #1018 (Dell Comics, 1959)
 Rio Conchos (Gold Key Comics, March 1965)
 Rob Roy, Four Color (Volume 2) #544 (Dell Comics, March 1954)
 Robert Kurtzman's Beneath The Valley of The Rage, based on The Rage (Fangoria Comics/The Scream Factory, August 2007—April 2008)
 RoboCop:
 RoboCop #1 (Marvel Comics, October 1987)
 RoboCop 2 #1—3 (Marvel Comics, August—September 1990)
 RoboCop Versus The Terminator #1—4 (Dark Horse Comics, September—December 1992)
 RoboCop 3 #1—3 (Dark Horse Comics, July—November 1993)
 Frank Miller's RoboCop #1—9 (Avatar Press, July 2003—January 2006)
 Robotech: The Movie (Academy Comics, November 1996)
 Rock & Roll High School #1—2 (Roger Corman's Cosmic Comics, October—November 1995)
 Rock & Rule, Marvel Comics Super Special #25 (Marvel Comics, August 1983)
 Rocketman: King of the Rocket Men #1—3 (Innovation Publishing, 1991)
 The Rocky Horror Picture Show: The Comic Book #1—3 (Caliber Comics, July 1990—January 1991)
 Rocky Lane:
 Powder River Rustlers (Fawcett Comics, 1950)
 Gunmen of Abilene, Fawcett Movie Comic #7 (Fawcett Comics, February 1950)
 Rustlers on Horseback Fawcett Movie Comic #8 (Fawcett Comics, June 1950)
 Code of the Silver Sage Motion Picture Comics #102 (Fawcett Comics, 1951)
 Covered Wagon Raid, Motion Picture Comics #103 (Fawcett Comics, 1951)
 Vigilante Hideout, Motion Picture Comics #104 (Fawcett Comics, May 1951)
 Frisco Tornado, Motion Picture Comics #107 (Fawcett Comics, November 1951)
 Rough Riders of Durango, Motion Picture Comics #109 (Fawcett Comics, March 1952)
 Rose of Cimarron, Fawcett Movie Comic #17 (Fawcett Comics, June 1952)
 The Runaway, Dell Movie Classics #707 (Dell Comics, October-December 1964)

S
 The Saint Strikes Back, Movie Comics #2 (Fawcett Comics, May 1939)
 Santa Claus Conquers the Martians, Dell Movie Classics #725 (Dell Comics, March 1966)
 Santa Claus: The Movie, Marvel Comics Super Special #39 (Marvel Comics, March 1986)
 Santiago, Four Color (Volume 2) #723 (Dell Comics, September 1956)
 Savage Sam, Walt Disney's World of Adventure #3 (Gold Key Comics, October 1963)
 Saw: Rebirth (IDW Publishing, October 2005)
 Scarface:
 Scarface: Scarred for Life #1—5 (IDW Publishing, December 2006—April 2007)
 Scarface: Devil in Disguise #1—5 (IDW Publishing, July—October 2007)
 The Scorpion King (Dark Horse Comics, March—April 2002)
 Scouts to the Rescue, Movie Comics #1—2 (DC Comics, April—May 1939)
 Scum of the Earth! (Aircel Comics, August—October 1991)
 The Searchers, Four Color (Volume 2) #709 (Dell Comics, June 1956)
 The Secret Life of Pets (Titan Comics, June—July 2019)
 The Secret of NIMH (Western Publishing, 1982)
 September Affair, Movie Love #5 (Eastern Color Printing, October 1950)
 Seven (Zenescope Entertainment, September 2006—October 2007)
 Serenity:
 Those Left Behind (Dark Horse Comics, July—September 2005)
 Better Days (Dark Horse Comics, March—May 2008)
Sgt. Pepper's Lonely Hearts Club Band, Marvel Comics Super Special #7 (Marvel Comics, 1979)
 The Shadow #1—2 (Dark Horse Comics, June—July 1994)
 The Shaggy Dog, Four Color (Volume 2) #985 (Dell Comics, 1959)
 The Sharkfighters, Four Color (Volume 2) #762 (Dell Comics, January 1957)
 Shaun of the Dead (IDW Publishing, June—August 2005)
 She-Devils on Wheels (Aircel Comics, June—August 1992)
 Shipwrecked! (W. D. Publications Inc., January 1991)
 Shrek (Dark Horse Comics, September—October 2003; Ape Entertainment, September 2010—April 2011; Joe Books Ltd., June—October 2016)
 Singin' in the Rain, Movie Love #14 (Eastern Color Printing, April 1952)
 Singing Guns (Fawcett Comics, 1950)
 Siren of Bagdad, Movie Love #21 (Eastern Color Printing, June 1953)
 Ski Party, Dell Movie Classics #743 (Dell Comics, September-November 1965)
 Slave Girl, Movie Comics #4 (Fiction House, 1947)
 Sleeping Beauty:
 Sleeping Beauty, Dell Giant #1 (Dell Comics, April 1959)
 Sleeping Beauty and the Prince, Four Color (Volume 2) #973 (Dell Comics, 1959)
 Sleeping Beauty's Fairy Godmothers, Four Color (Volume 2) #984 (Dell Comics, 1959)
 Sleepy Hollow (Vertigo, January 2000)
 Smoky, Dell Movie Classics #746 (Dell Comics, February 1967)
 The Small One, Walt Disney Showcase #48 (Gold Key Comics, January 1979)
 Snakes on a Plane #1—2 (DC Comics/WildStorm, October—November 2006) 
 Snow White and the Seven Dwarfs:
 Thumper Meets the Seven Dwarfs, Four Color (Volume 2) #19 (Dell Comics, 1943)
 Donald Duck and the Seven Dwarfs, Walt Disney's Comics and Stories #43 (Dell Comics, April 1944)
 The Seven Dwarfs and Thumper, Walt Disney's Comics and Stories #45 (Dell Comics, June 1944)
 Snow White and the Seven Dwarfs (1944), Four Color (Volume 2) #49 (Dell Comics, July 1944)
 The Seven Dwarfs and Dumbo, Four Color (Volume 2) #49 (Dell Comics, July 1944); Walt Disney's Comics and Stories #49, #55 (Dell Comics, October 1944, April 1945)
 The Seven Dwarfs and the Wicked Witch, Walt Disney's Comics and Stories #47 (Dell Comics, August 1944)
 Seven Dwarfs, Four Color (Volume 2) #227 (Dell Comics, May 1949)
 A New Adventure of Walt Disney's Snow White and the Seven Dwarfs, giveaway promo for Bendix Corporation (Western Publishing, 1952)
 "The Milky Way", giveaway promo for American Dairy Association (Western Publishing, 1955)
 "Mystery of the Missing Magic", Disney comic premium (Western Publishing, 1958)
 Snow White and the Seven Dwarfs (2019) #1—3 (Dark Horse Comics, June—August 2019) 
 Solomon and Sheba, Four Color #1070, Dell Comics (December 1959)
 Son of Frankenstein, Movie Comics #1 (DC Comics, April 1939)
 Song of the South:
 Uncle Remus and His Tales of Br'er Rabbit, Four Color (Volume 2) #129 (Dell Comics, 1946)
 "Br'er Rabbit Outwits Br'er Fox", Cheerios cereal premium (Western Publishing, 1947)
 "Br'er Rabbit's Secret", Cheerios cereal premium (Western Publishing, 1947)
 Br'er Rabbit Does It Again!, Four Color (Volume 2) #208 (Dell Comics, January 1949)
 "Br'er Rabbit's Sunken Treasure", Wheaties cereal premium (Western Publishing, 1951)
 "A Kite Tail", Reddy Kilowatt, Inc. premium (Western Publishing, 1955)
 "Ice Cream for the Party", American Dairy Association premium (Western Publishing, 1955)
 Sonic the Hedgehog 2: The Official Movie Pre-Quill (IDW Publishing, March 2022)
 The Sons of Katie Elder, Dell Movie Classics #748 (Dell Comics, September-November 1965)
 Southland Tales: The Prequel Saga (Graphitti Designs, May—July 2006):
 Two Roads Diverge (Graphitti Designs, May 2006)
 Fingerprints (Graphitti Designs, June 2006)
 The Mechanicals (Graphitti Designs, July 2006)
 Space Odyssey:
 2001: A Space Odyssey, Marvel Treasury Special (Marvel Comics, 1976); Regular series #1—10 (Marvel Comics, December 1976—September 1977)
 2010: The Year We Make Contact, Marvel Comics Super Special #37 (Marvel Comics, April 1985)
 Spartacus, Four Color #1139 (Dell Comics, November 1960)
 Species:
 Species #1—4 (Dark Horse Comics, June—August 1995)
 Species: Human Race #1—4 (Dark Horse Comics, November 1996—February 1997)
 Species Special #1 (Avatar Press, 2007)
 The Spirit of Culver, Movie Comics #3 (DC Comics, June 1939)
 Spy Kids:
 "Pop! Goes the World!", Disney Adventures (Disney Publishing Worldwide, September 2001)
 "Caught by the Web!", Disney Adventures (Disney Publishing Worldwide, November 2001)
 "The Menace of Micro-Man!", Disney Adventures (Disney Publishing Worldwide, January 2002)
 "F.A.N.G.s a Lot!", Disney Adventures (Disney Publishing Worldwide, March 2002)
 "The Big Drop!", Disney Adventures (Disney Publishing Worldwide, April 2002)
 "The Invisible Enemy!", Disney Adventures (Disney Publishing Worldwide, May 2002)
 "Fright Flight!", Disney Adventures (Disney Publishing Worldwide, June 2002)
 "Face to Face with F.A.N.G.!", Disney Adventures (Disney Publishing Worldwide, April 2003)
 Spy Kids 3-D: Game Over #1—6 (McDonald's, 2003)
 "Tomorrow Trouble!", Disney Adventures Comic Zone (Disney Publishing Worldwide, Summer 2004)
 Stagecoach, Movie Comics #2 (Fawcett Comics, May 1939)
 Star Reporter, Movie Comics #4 (DC Comics, July 1939)
 Star Trek:
 Star Trek: The Motion Picture, Marvel Comics Super Special #15 (Marvel Comics, March 1980)
 Star Trek III: The Search for Spock (DC Comics, 1984)
 Star Trek IV: The Voyage Home (DC Comics, 1986)
 Star Trek V: The Final Frontier (DC Comics, 1989)
 Star Trek VI: The Undiscovered Country (DC Comics, 1992)
 Star Trek Generations (DC Comics, 1994)
 Star Trek: First Contact (Marvel Comics/Paramount Comics, 1996)
 Star Trek II: The Wrath of Khan #1—3 (IDW Publishing, May—July 2009)
Star Trek: The Official Motion Picture Adaptation #1—6 (IDW Publishing, February—August 2010)
 Star Wars:
 Star Wars, Star Wars #1—6 (Marvel Comics, 1977)
 The Empire Strikes Back (Marvel Comics, August 1980)
 Return of the Jedi, Marvel Comics Super Special #27 (Marvel Comics, September 1983)
 Star Wars: A New Hope — The Special Edition #1—4 (Dark Horse Comics, January—April 1997)
 Star Wars: Episode I — The Phantom Menace #1—4 (Dark Horse Comics, May 1999)
 Star Wars: Episode II — Attack of the Clones #1—4 (Dark Horse Comics, April—May 2002)
 Star Wars: Episode III — Revenge of the Sith #1—4 (Dark Horse Comics, May 2005)
 Star Wars: The Force Awakens #1—6 (Marvel Comics, August 2016—January 2017)
 Rogue One: A Star Wars Story #1—6 (Marvel Comics, June—November 2017)
 Star Wars: The Last Jedi #1—6 (Marvel Comics, July—November 2018)
 Solo: A Star Wars Story #1—7 (Marvel Comics, December 2018—June 2019)
 Star Wars: The Rise of Skywalker (IDW Publishing/Disney Lucasfilm Press, March 2021)
Stargate:
 Stargate #1—4 (Entity Comics, July—October 1996)
 Stargate: Doomsday World #1—3 (Entity Comics, November 1996—January 1997)
 Stargate: One Nation Under Ra #1 (Entity Comics, April 1997)
 Stargate: Underworld #1 (Entity Comics, May 1997)
Starship Troopers:
Starship Troopers: Brute Creations #1 (Dark Horse Comics, September 1997) 
Starship Troopers #1—2 (Dark Horse Comics, October—November 1997)
Starship Troopers: Insect Touch #1—3 (Dark Horse Comics, May—August 1998)
Starship Troopers: Dominant Species #1—4 (Dark Horse Comics, August—November 1998)
The Stooge, Movie Love #13 (Eastern Color Printing, February 1952)
Stormbreaker: The Graphic Novel (Philomel Books, November 2006)
Stormy, Four Color #537 (Dell Comics, 1954)
The Story of Mankind, Four Color (Volume 2) #851 (Dell Comics, January 1958)
 The Story of Robin Hood:
 Robin Hood, Four Color (Volume 2) #413 (Dell Comics, 1952)
 "The Miller's Ransom", New Adventures of Walt Disney's Robin Hood #1, giveaway promo for Robin Hood Flour (1952)
 "Ghosts of Waylea Castle", New Adventures of Walt Disney's Robin Hood #2, giveaway promo for Robin Hood Flour (1952)
The Story of Ruth, Four Color (Volume 2) #1144 (Dell Comics, September 1960)
Strange Days (Marvel Comics, December 1995)
Street Fighter: The Battle for Shadaloo (DC Comics, December 1994)
Street Fighter II Movie, CoroCoro Comic (Shogakukan, 1994)
Streets of New York, Movie Comics #4 (DC Comics, July 1939)
Submarine Command, Movie Love #12 (Eastern Color Printing, December 1951)
Sukiyaki Western: Django, Big Comic Superior (Shogakukan, June 2007)
Summer Magic (Gold Key Comics, September 1963)
Sunset Carson:
Sunset Carson Rides Again, Cowboy Western Comics #27 (Charlton Comics, February 1950)
Battling Marshal, Cowboy Western Comics #28 (Charlton Comics, June 1950)
Fighting Mustang, Cowboy Western Comics #28 (Charlton Comics, June 1950)
Rio Grande, Cowboy Western Comics #29 (Charlton Comics, October 1950)
Deadline, Cowboy Western Comics #30 (Charlton Comics, December 1950)
Swiss Family Robinson, Four Color (Volume 2) #1156 (Dell Comics, January 1961)
The Sword and the Dragon, Four Color #1118 (Dell Comics, June 1960)
The Sword and the Rose, Four Color #505 (Dell Comics, 1953)
The Sword in the Stone:
 Wart and the Wizard #1 (Gold Key Comics, November 1963)
 The Sword in the Stone (Gold Key Comics, February 1964)

T
 Tales of Terror, Dell Movie Classics #793 (Dell Comics, February 1963)
 Tammy Tell Me True, Four Color (Volume 2) #1233 (Dell Comics, 1961)
 Tarzan (1999) (Dark Horse Comics, June—July 1999)
 Ten Tall Men, Fawcett Movie Comic #16 (Fawcett Comics, April 1952)
 Ten Who Dared, Four Color #1178 (Dell Comics, December 1960)
 Terminator:
 Terminator 2: Judgment Day #1—3 (Marvel Comics, September—October 1991)
 Terminator 3 #1—6 (Beckett Comics, June—December 2003)
 Painkiller Jane vs. The Terminator, Terminator 2 #6—7 (Dynamite Entertainment, December 2007—March 2008)
 Terminator Salvation: Movie Prequel #1—4 (IDW Publishing, January—April 2009)
 Terminator Salvation: Movie Preview #0 (IDW Publishing, April 2009)
 Terminator/RoboCop: Kill Human #1—4 (Dynamite Entertainment, July—November 2011)
 Terminator Genisys  (Titan Comics, November 2015)
 Transformers vs. The Terminator #1—4 (IDW Publishing/Dark Horse Comics, March—September 2020)
 The Texas Chainsaw Massacre:
 Leatherface #1—4, loosely based on the third film (Northstar Comics, March 1991—May 1992)
 Jason vs. Leatherface #1—3 (Topps Comics, October 1995—January 1996)
 The Texas Chainsaw Massacre Special #1 (Avatar Press, April 2005)
 The Texas Chainsaw Massacre: The Grind #1—3 (Avatar Press, May—June 2006)
 The Texas Chainsaw Massacre: Fearbook #1 (Avatar Press, 2006)
 The Texas Chainsaw Massacre #1—6 (DC Comics/WildStorm, January—June 2007)
 The Texas Chainsaw Massacre: Cut! #1 (DC Comics/WildStorm, August 2007)
 The Texas Chainsaw Massacre: About a Boy #1 (DC Comics/WildStorm, September 2007)
 The Texas Chainsaw Massacre: By Himself #1 (DC Comics/WildStorm, October 2007)
 "The Texas Chainsaw Salesman", New Line Cinema's Tales of Horror #1 (DC Comics/WildStorm, November 2007)
 The Texas Chainsaw Massacre: Raising Cain #1—3 (DC Comics/WildStorm, July—September 2008)
 The Texas Rangers, Motion Picture Comics #106 (Fawcett Comics, September 1951)
 That Darn Cat! (Gold Key Comics, February 1966)
 That's My Boy, Movie Love #12 (Eastern Color Printing, December 1951)
 The Thief of Baghdad, Four Color (Volume 2) #1229 (Dell Comics, 1961)
 The Thing:
 The Thing from Another World #1—2 (Dark Horse Comics, 1991—1992)
 The Thing from Another World: Climate of Fear #1—4 (Dark Horse Comics, July—December 1992)
 The Thing from Another World: Eternal Vows #1—4 (Dark Horse Comics, December 1993—March 1994)
 The Thing from Another World: Questionable Research, Dark Horse Comics #13—16 (Dark Horse Comics, December 1993—March 1994)
 The Thing: The Northman Nightmare (Dark Horse Comics, September 2011)
 Those Magnificent Men in Their Flying Machines (Gold Key Comics, October 1965)
 The Three Caballeros:
 Three Caballeros, Four Color (Volume 2) #71 (Dell Comics, 1945)
 "Pablo, the Cold-blooded Penguin", Silly Symphonies #3 (Dell Comics, February 1954)
 "The Flying Gauchito", Silly Symphonies #3 (Dell Comics, February 1954)
 Three Husbands, Movie Love #7 (Eastern Color Printing, February 1951)
 The Three Musketeers (Marvel Comics, January—February 1994)
 The Three Stooges:
 The Three Stooges Meet Hercules, Dell Movie Classics #828 (Dell Comics, August 1962)
 The Three Stooges in Orbit (Gold Key Comics, November 1962)
 The Three Stooges Go Around the World in a Daze, The Three Stooges #15 (Gold Key Comics, January 1964)
 The Three Stooges — The Outlaws Is Coming, The Three Stooges #22 (Gold Key Comics, March 1965)
 A Tiger Walks (Gold Key Comics, June 1964)
 Time Bandits (Marvel Comics, February 1982)
 The Time Machine, Four Color (Volume 2) #1085 (Dell Comics, March 1960)
 The Tinglers, based on The Tingler, Vincent Price Presents Special #1—2 (TidalWave Productions, September—October 2009)
 Titan A.E. #1—3 (Dark Horse Comics, May—July 2000)
 To Die For (Blackthorne Publishing, March 1989)
 Toby Tyler, Four Color (Volume 2) #1092 (Dell Comics, March 1960)
 The Tomb of Ligeia, Dell Movie Classics #830 (Dell Comics, April-June 1965)
 Tom Thumb, Four Color (Volume 2) #972 (Dell Comics, January 1959)
 Tonka, Four Color (Volume 2) #966 (Dell Comics, 1958)
 The Torch, Movie Love #4 (Eastern Color Printing, August 1950)
 Total Recall:
 Total Recall #1 (DC Comics, 1990)
 Total Recall: Life on Mars #1—4 (Dynamite Entertainment, May—August 2011)
 The Toxic Avenger:
 The Toxic Avenger #1—11 (Marvel Comics, April 1991—February 1992)
 The New Adventures of the Toxic Avenger #1 (Troma Comics, July 2000)
 Lloyd Kaufman Presents: The Toxic Avenger and Other Tromatic Tales (Devil's Due Publishing, October 2007) 
 Toy Story:
 Toy Story (1995), adaptation of the first film (Marvel Comics, 1995)
 Toy Story: The Mysterious Stranger  (Boom! Studios, May—July 2009)
 Toy Story (2009) (Boom! Studios, November 2009—September 2010)
 Toy Story: Tales from the Toy Chest (Boom! Studios, July—October 2010) 
 Toy Story (2012) (Marvel Comics, March—June 2012)
 Toy Story (2017) (Joe Books Ltd., 2017)
 Toy Story Adventures (Dark Horse Comics, April—September 2019) 
 Toy Story 4 (Dark Horse Comics, May 2019)
 Toy Story (2019), manga adaptation of the first and second films (Tokyopop, June 2019) 
 Trancers:
 Trancers: The Adventures of Jack Deth #1—2 (Eternity Comics, August—September 1991)
 Trancers #1—3 (Action Lab Entertainment, October 2015—January 2016)
The Transformers: The Movie:
 The Transformers: The Movie #1—3 (Marvel Comics, December 1986—February 1987)
 Transformers: The Animated Movie #1—4 (IDW Publishing, October 2006—January 2007)
 Transformers (based on the live action film series):
 Transformers: Official Movie Adaptation #1—4 (IDW Publishing, 2007)
 Transformers: Revenge of the Fallen — Official Movie Adaptation #1—4 (IDW Publishing, 2009)
 Transformers: Dark of the Moon — Movie Adaptation #1—4 (IDW Publishing, 2011)
 Treasure Island, Four Color (Volume 2) #624 (Dell Comics, 1955)
 Tron:
 Tron: The Ghost in the Machine #1—6 (Slave Labor Graphics, April 2006—September 2008)
 Tron: Betrayal #1—2 (Marvel Comics, October—November 2010)
 Tron: Original Movie Adaptation #1—2 (Marvel Comics, January—February 2011)
 True-Life Adventures:
 Beaver Valley, Four Color (Volume 2) #625 (Dell Comics, 1955)
 The African Lion, Four Color (Volume 2) #665 (Dell Comics, 1955)
 Water Birds and the Olympic Elk, Four Color (Volume 2) #700 (Dell Comics, 1956)
 Secrets of Life, Four Color (Volume 2) #749 (Dell Comics, 1956)
 Bear Country, Four Color (Volume 2) #758 (Dell Comics, 1956)
 Perri, Four Color (Volume 2) #847 (Dell Comics, 1957)
 White Wilderness, Four Color (Volume 2) #943 (Dell Comics, 1958)
 Jungle Cat, Four Color (Volume 2) #1136 (Dell Comics, September 1960)
 The True Story of Jesse James, Four Color (Volume 2) #757 (Dell Comics, March 1957)
 Twice-Told Tales, Dell Movie Classics #840 (Dell Comics, November 1963-January 1964)
 Twins of Evil, The House of Hammer #7 (Top Sellers Ltd., April 1977)
 Two on a Guillotine, Dell Movie Classics #850 (Dell Comics, April-June 1965)
 Two Weeks with Love, Movie Love #6 (Eastern Color Printing, December 1950)

U
 Uncle Scrooge and Money (Gold Key Comics, March 1967)
 The Under-Pup, Movie Comics #6 (DC Comics, October 1939)
 The Underwater City, Four Color (Volume 2) #1328 (Dell Comics, 1962)
 Underworld:
 Underworld (IDW Publishing, September 2003)
 Underworld: Red in Tooth and Claw #1—4 (IDW Publishing, March—May 2004)
 Underworld: Evolution (IDW Publishing, February 2006)
 Underworld: Rise of the Lycans #1—2 (IDW Publishing, November 2008)
 Unidentified Flying Oddball, Walt Disney Showcase #52 (Gold Key Comics, September 1979)
 Universal Monsters (Dark Horse Comics line):
 Dracula, adaptation of the 1931 film (Dark Horse Comics, 1993)
 Frankenstein, adaptation of the 1931 film (Dark Horse Comics, 1993)
 The Mummy, adaptation of the 1932 film (Dark Horse Comics, 1993)
 Creature from the Black Lagoon, adaptation of the 1954 film (Dark Horse Comics, 1993)
 Universal Soldier #1—3 (NOW Comics, September—November 1992)

V
 The Valley of Gwangi, Dell Movie Classics #880 (Dell Comics, December 1969)
 Vampire Circus, The House of Hammer #17 (Top Sellers Ltd., February 1978)
 The Vanishing Westerner, Motion Picture Comics #101 (Fawcett Comics, 1950)
 The Vanquished, Movie Love #22 (Eastern Color Printing, August 1953)
 View Askewniverse:
 Bluntman and Chronic (Image Comics, December 2001)
 Chasing Dogma (Oni Press, October 1999)
 Clerks: The Comic Book (Oni Press, February 1998)
 Clerks Holiday Special (Oni Press, December 1998)
 Clerks: The Lost Scene (Oni Press, December 1999)
 Tales from Clerks II (Graphitti Designs, July 2006)
 "Walt Flanagan's Dog", Oni Double Feature #1 (Oni Press, January 1998)
 The Vikings, Four Color (Volume 2) #910 (Dell Comics, June 1958)
 The  Virgin Queen, Four Color (Volume 2) #644 (Dell Comics, August 1955)
 Voyage to the Bottom of the Sea, Four Color (Volume 2) #1230 (Dell Comics, 1961)

W
 Walk East on Beacon, Motion Picture Comics #113 (Fawcett Comics, November 1952)
 WALL·E #0—7 (Boom! Studios, November 2009—June 2010)
 Wallace and Gromit:
 Wallace and Gromit: A Grand Day Out (BBC Books, April 1999)
 Walt Disney Specials:
 "Chicken Little", Silly Symphonies #1 (Dell Comics, September 1952)
 "Lambert the Sheepish Lion", Silly Symphonies #2 (Dell Comics, September 1953)
 "The Pelican and the Snipe", Silly Symphonies #2 (Dell Comics, September 1953)
 Ben and Me, Four Color (Volume 2) #539 (Dell Comics, March 1954)
 "Morris, The Midget Moose", Silly Symphonies #4 (Dell Comics, August 1954)
 The Truth About Mother Goose, Four Color (Volume 2) #862 (Dell Comics, 1957)
 "Paul Bunyan", Silly Symphonies #9 (Dell Comics, February 1959)
 "Social Lion", Silly Symphonies #9 (Dell Comics, February 1959)
 "Goliath II", Silly Symphonies #9 (Dell Comics, February 1959)
 War-Gods of the Deep, Dell Movie Classics #900 (Dell Classics, July-September 1965)
 The War Wagon, Dell Movie Classics #533 (Dell Comics, September 1967)
 Warlock #1—4 (TidalWave Productions, March—June 2009)
 Warpath, Fawcett Movie Comic #13 (Fawcett Comics, August 1951)
 The Warriors:
 The Warriors #1—5 (Dabel Brothers Productions/Dynamite Entertainment, February 2009—February 2011)
 The Warriors: Jailbreak #1—4 (Dynamite Entertainment, 2012)
 Waterworld: Children of Leviathan #1—4, based on Waterworld (Acclaim Comics, August—November 1997)
 Waxwork (Blackthorne Publishing, November 1988)
 Westward Ho the Wagons!:
 Westward Ho the Wagons!, Four Color (Volume 2) #738 (Dell Comics, 1956)
 Wringle Wrangle, Four Color (Volume 2) #821 (Dell Comics, 1957)
 When Worlds Collide, Motion Picture Comics #110 (Fawcett Comics, May 1951)
 White Fang (W. D. Publications Inc., 1990)
 White Tie and Tails, Movie Comics #3 (Fiction House, 1947)
 Who Framed Roger Rabbit:
 Who Framed Roger Rabbit: The Official Comics Adaptation, Marvel Graphic Novel #41 (Marvel Comics, May 1988)
 Roger Rabbit: The Resurrection of Doom, Marvel Graphic Novel #54 (Marvel Comics, 1989)
 Roger Rabbit (Disney Comics, 1989—1991)
 Roger Rabbit's Toontown (Disney Comics, May—August 1991)
 Who's Minding the Mint?, Dell Movie Classics #924 (Dell Comics, August 1967)
 Willow #1—3 (Marvel Comics, August—October 1988)
 Winchester '73, Cowboy Western Comics #29 (Charlton Comics, October 1950)
 The Wings of Eagles, Four Color (Volume 2) #790 (Dell Comics, April 1957)
 Winnie the Pooh (Gold Key Comics, January 1977—July 1984)
 Witch Mountain:
 Escape to Witch Mountain, Walt Disney Showcase #29 (Gold Key Comics, June 1975)
 Return from Witch Mountain, Walt Disney Showcase #44 (Gold Key Comics, June 1978)
 "Witchfinder", based on Witchfinder General, Vincent Price Presents #20 (TidalWave Productions, July 2010)
 Wolf Call, Movie Comics #5 (DC Comics, August 1939)
 The Wolf Man, Dell Movie Classics #922 (Dell Comics, June-August 1963) 
 WolfCop (Dynamite Entertainment, 2016)
 The Wonderful World of the Brothers Grimm (Gold Key Comics, October 1962)
 The Wonders of Aladdin, Four Color (Volume 2) #1255 (Dell Comics, 1961)
 The World's Greatest Athlete, Walt Disney Showcase #14 (Gold Key Comics, April 1973)

X: The Man with the X-ray Eyes

Xanadu

The X-Files

Yellowstone Kelly

Zulu

Comics based on films based on comics

The Amazing Spider-Man

Asterix Conquers Rome (based on The Twelve Tasks of Asterix, Pilote, 1976)

Astro Boy

Barb Wire

Batman (1989 film series)

Batman: The Animated Series (films)

Batman Beyond

Blade

Captain America

Catwoman

Constantine

Daredevil

The Dark Knight Trilogy

Dick Tracy

Elektra

Fantastic Four

Flash Gordon

Green Lantern

Howard the Duck

Hulk

Judge Dredd

Man-Thing

Marvel Cinematic Universe

The Mask

Men in Black

Prince Valiant

The Punisher

Red Sonja

Richie Rich

Rocketeer

Sheena

Spawn

Spider-Man (2002 film series)

Steel

Superman (1978 film series)

Superman Returns

Swamp Thing

Tank Girl

Teenage Mutant Ninja Turtles

Timecop

Tintin and the Lake of Sharks (Éditions Casterman/Methuen Publishing, 1973)

X-Men

Comics based on unproduced films

See also
Lists of comics based on media
List of comics based on fiction
List of comics based on television programs
List of comics based on video games
Lists of media based on comics
List of films based on comics
List of novels based on comics
List of video games based on comics
List of television programs based on comics
Lists of films based on media
Lists of works of fiction made into feature films
List of short fiction made into feature films
List of films based on poems
List of films based on comic strips
List of films based on manga
List of films based on magazine articles
List of films based on toys
List of films based on video games
List of films based on television programs
List of films based on film books
List of live-action films based on cartoons and comics
Lists of media based on films
List of video games based on films
List of television programs based on films

References

 
Films, comics based on
Comics